This page details statistics of the European Cup and Champions League. Unless notified these statistics concern all seasons since inception of the European Cup in the 1955–56 season, and renamed since 1992 as the UEFA Champions League. Does not include the qualifying rounds of the UEFA Champions League, unless otherwise noted.

General performances

By club 

A total of 22 clubs have won the tournament since its 1955 inception, with Real Madrid being the only team to win it fourteen times, including the first five. Only three other clubs have reached ten or more finals: Milan, Bayern Munich and Liverpool. A total of thirteen clubs have won the tournament multiple times: the four forementioned clubs, along with Ajax, Barcelona, Inter Milan, Manchester United, Benfica, Nottingham Forest, Juventus, Porto and Chelsea. A total of twenty clubs have reached the final without ever managing to win the tournament.

Clubs from ten countries have provided tournament winners. Spanish clubs have been the most successful, winning nineteen titles. England is second with fourteen and Italy is third with twelve, while the other multiple-time winners are Germany with eight, the Netherlands with six, and Portugal with four. The only other countries to provide a tournament winner are Scotland, Romania, Yugoslavia, and France. Greece, Belgium and Sweden have all provided losing finalists.

By nation

Overall team records 
In this ranking two points are awarded for a win, 1 for a draw and 0 for a loss. As per statistical convention in football, matches decided in extra time are counted as wins and losses, while matches decided by penalty shoot-outs are counted as draws. Teams are ranked by total points, then by goal difference, then by goals scored. Only the top 25 are listed.

Number of participating clubs of the Champions League era (from 1992–present) 

A total of 147 clubs from 34 national associations have played in or qualified for the Champions League group stage. Season in bold represents teams qualified for the knockout phase that season. Between 1999–2000 and 2002–03, qualification is considered from the second group stage.

European Cup group stage participants
(only one season was played in this format)

1991–92:
  Anderlecht
  Barcelona
  Benfica
  Dynamo Kyiv
  Panathinaikos
  Red Star Belgrade
  Sampdoria
Sampdoria is the only side to have played in 1991–92 European Cup group stage, but to have not played in the Champions League group stage.
  Sparta Prague

Goals 
 Most goals scored in a matchday: 63 (matchday 1 of the first group stage, 2000–01 season).
 Most goals scored in a season: 449 (2000–01 season).

Host of the finals 
 The city that has hosted the final the most times is London, doing so on seven occasions. Of these, five have been played at the original Wembley Stadium and twice at the new Wembley Stadium. Paris come joint second, having hosted six finals.
 The nation that has hosted the most finals is Italy, with nine (Milan and Rome four times each and Bari once). England (London seven times and Manchester once), Spain (Madrid five times, Barcelona twice and Sevilla once) and Germany (Munich four times, Stuttgart twice, Berlin and Gelsenkirchen once each) comes second with eight each.
 The original Wembley Stadium has a record for the stadium that has hosted the most final matches, with five times (1963, 1968, 1971, 1978 and 1992). Santiago Bernabéu, Heysel Stadium, San Siro and Stadio Olimpico comes second with four times each.
 The nation that has hosted the finals with most different stadiums is Germany, with five stadiums (Neckarstadion, Olympiastadion (Munich), Arena AufSchalke, Allianz Arena and Olympiastadion (Berlin)). Spain comes second, with four stadiums (Santiago Bernabéu, Ramón Sánchez Pizjuán, Camp Nou and Metropolitano Stadium).

Clubs

By semi-final appearances 

 
By nation

 
Note: In the 1992 and 1993 seasons there were no semi-finals as the finalists qualified via a group stage. The winners (Sampdoria and Barcelona in 1992, Marseille and Milan in 1993) and runners-up (Red Star Belgrade and Sparta Prague in 1992, Rangers and IFK Göteborg in 1993) of the two groups are marked as semi-finalists in the table.

Unbeaten sides 
 Ten clubs have won either the European Cup or the Champions League unbeaten, and only four clubs have done so twice:
 Liverpool had six wins and three draws in 1980–81, and seven wins and two draws in 1983–84.
 Milan had five wins and four draws in 1988–89, and seven wins and five draws in 1993–94.
 Ajax had seven wins and two draws in 1971–72, and 7 wins and 4 draws in 1994–95.
 Manchester United had five wins and six draws in 1998–99, and nine wins and four draws in 2007–08. 
 Six clubs have done so on one occasion:
 Inter Milan had seven wins and two draws in 1963–64.
 Nottingham Forest had six wins and three draws in 1978–79.
 Red Star Belgrade had five wins and four draws in 1990–91.
 Marseille had seven wins and four draws in 1992–93.
 Barcelona had nine wins and four draws in 2005–06.
 Bayern Munich had eleven wins in eleven games in the reduced-schedule 2019–20, becoming the first side in any European competition to claim a trophy with a 100 percent winning record.
 The team to have won the European Cup with the fewest games won is PSV Eindhoven (1987–88), managing just three victories in the entire tournament, including none from the quarter-finals onwards.
 The team to have won the Champions League with the fewest games won is Manchester United (1998–99), with five wins.
 Three teams have won the Champions League with the most games lost, Liverpool (2018–19), Milan (2002–03) and Real Madrid (1999–2000 and 2021–22), all losing four games.

Final success rate 

 Only two clubs have appeared in the final of the European Cup/Champions league more than once, with a 100% success rate:
 Nottingham Forest (1979, 1980)
 Porto (1987, 2004)
 Four clubs have appeared in the final once, being victorious on that occasion:
 Feyenoord (1970)
 Aston Villa (1982)
 PSV Eindhoven (1988)
 Red Star Belgrade (1991)
 On the opposite end of the scale, twenty clubs have played at least one final, but never won. Only three of these have appeared in the final more than once, losing on each occasion:
 Reims (1956, 1959)
 Valencia (2000, 2001)
 Atlético Madrid (1974, 2014, 2016)
 Of the 22 teams who have won the trophy, only two have lost more finals than they have won:
 Juventus two wins (1985, 1996) and seven losses (1973, 1983, 1997, 1998, 2003, 2015, 2017)
 Benfica two wins (1961, 1962) and five losses (1963, 1965, 1968, 1988, 1990)

Consecutive appearances 
 Most consecutive seasons in the European Cup: 15, Real Madrid (1955–56 to 1969–70)
 Most consecutive seasons in the UEFA Champions League: 26, Real Madrid (1997–98 to 2022–23)
 Most consecutive seasons in the UEFA Champions League knockout phase: 26, Real Madrid (1997–98 to 2022–23)
 Most consecutive quarter-final appearances: 13, Barcelona (2007–08 to 2019–20)
 Most consecutive semi-final appearances: 8, Real Madrid (2010–11 to 2017–18)
 Most consecutive final appearances: 5, Real Madrid (1956 to 1960)
 Most consecutive final appearances (Champions League era): 3 – joint record
 Milan (1993 to 1995)
 Juventus (1996 to 1998)
 Real Madrid (2016 to 2018)

Winning other trophies 

See also Treble (association football) and List of association football teams to have won four or more trophies in one season.

 Although not an officially recognised achievement, seven clubs have achieved the distinction of winning the Champions League or European Cup, their domestic championship, and their primary domestic cup competition in the same season, known colloquially as the "continental treble":
 Celtic in 1967, having won the European Cup, the Scottish First Division, and the Scottish Cup
 Ajax in 1972 won the European Cup, the Eredivisie, and the KNVB Cup
 PSV Eindhoven in 1988 did likewise, having won the European Cup, the Eredivisie, and the KNVB Cup
 Manchester United in 1999, having won the Premier League, the FA Cup, and the Champions League
 Barcelona in 2009, which included La Liga, the Copa del Rey, and the Champions League
 Inter Milan in 2010, which included Serie A, the Coppa Italia, and the Champions League
 Bayern Munich in 2013, which included Bundesliga, the DFB-Pokal, and the Champions League
 Barcelona in 2015 won the treble for the second time, having won La Liga, the Copa del Rey, and the Champions League
 Bayern Munich in 2020 became the second club to win multiple trebles, having won the Bundesliga, the DFB-Pokal, and the Champions League
Liverpool in 1984 won the English First Division and the European Cup. However, this 'treble' included the Football League Cup rather than the FA Cup.
 Bayern Munich in 2001 won the Bundesliga and the Champions League. However, this 'treble' included the DFB-Ligapokal rather than the DFB-Pokal.
In addition to this treble, several of these clubs went on to win further cups. However, most of these cups were technically won the following year following the conclusion of regular domestic or international leagues the year before. Also, several domestic cups may not have been extant at the time that equivalent cups were won by clubs of other nations, and in some cases they remain so. Furthermore, there is much variance in the regard with which several cups are taken both over time and between nations. Regardless, the following clubs all won competitions further to the treble mentioned above:
 Celtic also won their secondary domestic cup competition, the Scottish League Cup, as well as the regional Glasgow Cup, in the 1966–67 season concurrently with the treble of cups mentioned previously (sometimes colloquially referred to as a part of "the quintuple"), thus making their achievement unique in this respect to every other club.
 Ajax also won the Intercontinental Cup (the predecessor of the FIFA Club World Cup and the de facto premier global club cup) and the inaugural (and technically unofficial) UEFA Super Cup the following season, forming part of a quintuple of Cup successes; they thus won all available cups to them.
 Manchester United won the Intercontinental Cup the following season, winning a quadruple of cups.
 Barcelona won the FIFA Club World Cup, the European Super Cup, and the Supercopa de España the following season, making it a sextuple of cup successes, and thus winning all available cups to them.
 Bayern Munich won the DFL-Supercup in the start of the 2012–13 season, the European Super Cup in 2013 and the FIFA Club World Cup in the same year winning a quintuple of cups.
 Inter Milan completed the quintuple by winning Serie A, the Coppa Italia, the Champions League, the FIFA Club World Cup, and the Supercoppa Italiana.
 Barcelona completed their quintuple in 2015 by lifting La Liga, the Copa del Rey, the Champions League, the UEFA Super Cup, and the Club World Cup.
 Bayern Munich also won the European Super Cup and the DFL-Supercup in 2020, and the FIFA Club World Cup in February 2021 to become the second sextuple winning club after Barcelona.
 Juventus, Ajax, Bayern Munich, Chelsea, and Manchester United are also the only teams to have won the original three major UEFA competitions, namely Champions League/European Cup, Cup Winners' Cup, and Europa League/UEFA Cup.
 Until the first staging of the UEFA Europa Conference League in 2022, Juventus was the first and only club in football history to have won all six official UEFA-sanctioned tournaments, a record claimed after their 1999 Intertoto Cup victory.

Best debuts 
Five clubs managed to win the European Cup on their debut:
 Real Madrid (1955–56)
 Inter Milan (1963–64)
 Celtic (1966–67)
 Nottingham Forest (1978–79)
 Aston Villa (1981–82)

Three clubs won the Champions League on their debut:
 Marseille (1992–93)
 Ajax (1994–95)
 Juventus (1995–96)

Biggest wins 
 The following teams won a single match by ten goals or more in the preliminary rounds of the European Cup:
 Dinamo București beat Crusaders 11–0 in 1973–74
 Feyenoord beat KR Reykjavík 12–2 in 1969–70
 Manchester United beat Anderlecht 10–0 in 1956–57
 Ipswich Town beat Floriana 10–0 in 1962–63
 Benfica beat Stade Dudelange 10–0 in 1965–66
 Leeds United beat Lyn 10–0 in 1969–70
 Borussia Mönchengladbach beat EPA Larnaca 10–0 in 1970–71
 Ajax beat Omonia 10–0 in 1979–80
 The largest single match margin of victory in the current Champions League format is 10–0:
 HJK beat Bangor City in the second qualifying round in 2011–12
 The largest single match margin of victory in the group stage is 8–0:
 Liverpool beat Beşiktaş in the group stage in 2007–08
 Real Madrid beat Malmö FF in the group stage in 2015–16
 The largest single match margin of victory in the knockout phase of the current Champions League format is 7–0:
 Bayern Munich beat Basel in the first knockout round in 2011–12
 Bayern Munich beat Shakhtar Donetsk in the first knockout round in 2014–15
 Manchester City beat Schalke 04 in the first knockout round in 2018–19
 Manchester City beat RB Leipzig in the first knockout round in 2022–23
 The largest single match margin of victory in the quarter-finals of the knockout phase is eight goals:
 Real Madrid beat Sevilla 8–0 in 1957–58 
 The largest single match margin of victory in the quarter-finals of the knockout phase in Champions League era is six goals:
 Manchester United beat Roma 7–1 in 2006–07 
 Bayern Munich beat Barcelona 8–2 in 2019–20
 The largest single match margin of victory in the semi-finals of the knockout phase is six goals:
 Real Madrid beat Zürich 6–0 in 1963–64 
 The largest single match margin of victory in the semi-finals of the knockout phase in Champions League era is 4–0:
 Bayern Munich beat Barcelona in 2012–13
 Real Madrid beat Bayern Munich in 2013–14
 Liverpool beat Barcelona in 2018–19
 The largest margin of victory in a final is four goals:
 Real Madrid beat Eintracht Frankfurt 7–3 in 1960
 Bayern Munich beat Atlético Madrid 4–0 in 1974 (replay)
 Milan beat Steaua București 4–0 in 1989
 Milan beat Barcelona 4–0 in 1994
 The largest single match margin of victory for an away side is 7–0:
 Marseille beat Žilina in the group stage in 2010–11
 Shakhtar Donetsk beat BATE Borisov in the group stage in 2014–15
 Liverpool beat Maribor in the group stage in 2017–18

Biggest two leg wins 
 Benfica hold the overall record for highest aggregate win in the competition. They beat Stade Dudelange 18–0 (8–0 away, 10–0 at home) in the preliminary round in 1965–66.
 As for the group stage, the record belongs to Shakhtar Donetsk, who beat BATE Borisov 12–0 (7–0 away, 5–0 at home) in 2014–15. Including the preliminary rounds, HJK hold the Champions League era record, beating Bangor City 13–0 (3–0 away, 10–0 at home) in 2011–12.
 Bayern Munich hold the biggest margin of victory on aggregate in the knockout phase of the Champions League era. They beat Sporting CP 12–1 (5–0 away, 7–1 at home) in the round of 16 in 2008–09.
 Real Madrid hold the record for the biggest win in a quarter-final tie, beating Sevilla 10–2 (8–0 at home, 2–2 away) in 1957–58. Bayern Munich and Real Madrid share the record for the biggest win since the 1992 rebranding; Bayern beat 1. FC Kaiserslautern 6–0 (2–0 at home, 4–0 away) in 1998–99, and Barcelona 8–2 in a single leg tie in 2019–20, while Madrid achieved the same feat against APOEL in 2011–12, winning 8–2 (3–0 away, 5–2 at home).
 Eintracht Frankfurt hold the record for the biggest win in a semi-final tie, beating Rangers 12–4 (6–1, 6–3) in 1959–60. Bayern Munich hold the record in the Champions League era, beating Barcelona 7–0 (4–0 at home, 3–0 away) in 2012–13.

Deciding drawn ties

Play-offs 
 The first play-off match held was Borussia Dortmund's 7–0 win against Spora Luxembourg in the preliminary round in 1956–57, after the first two games between the sides had ended 5–5 on aggregate (4–3 win for Dortmund, 2–1 win for Spora).
 The last play-off match held was Ajax's 3–0 win against Benfica in the quarter-finals in 1968–69, after the first two games between the sides had ended 4–4 on aggregate (3–1 win for Benfica, 3–1 win for Ajax).
 The first (and only) replayed final was in 1974, with Bayern Munich defeating Atlético Madrid 4–0, following a 1–1 in the first meeting after extra time.
 A total of 32 play-offs have been played. Real Madrid is the only team to have won three play-offs, doing so in 1956–57, 1958–59 and 1961–62, and progressing to the final in all three seasons. Feyenoord is the only team to win two play-offs in the same season, beating Servette in the preliminary round and Vasas in the first round in 1962–63. Wismut Karl Marx Stadt and Atlético Madrid have played the most overall play-offs, with four each.

Coin toss 
 The first coin toss occurred in 1957–58, with Wismut Karl Marx Stadt beating Gwardia Warsaw after their play-off was abandoned after 100 minutes due to floodlight power failure.
 Zürich won a coin toss against Galatasaray in 1963–64 after their play-off match ended 2–2. This was the first time this rule was used for a draw played to completion.
 The last season to use a coin toss was 1969–70, with Galatasaray beating Spartak Trnava and Celtic beating Benfica, both in the second round. Celtic later progressed to the final.
 A total of seven European Cup ties were decided by a coin toss, with Galatasaray being the only team to be involved twice, winning one and losing one.

Away goals 
 The away goals rule was introduced in 1967–68, with Valur beating Jeunesse Esch 4–4 (1–1 at home, 3–3 away) and Benfica beating Glentoran 1–1 (1–1 away, 0–0 at home), both in the first round. Benfica later progressed to the final.
 In 2002–03, Milan and Inter met in the semi-finals. Sharing the same stadium (San Siro), they drew 0–0 in the first leg and 1–1 in the second. However, Milan were the designated away side in the latter, and thus became the only team to win on "away" goals without having scored a goal away from their own stadium.
 The quarter-final of the 2020–21 season between previous year's finalists Bayern Munich and Paris Saint-Germain was the last to be decided by the away goals rule before its abolition from the following season.
 Milan, Paris Saint-Germain and Porto are the only teams to have advanced on the away goals rule after extra time:
 In the semi-finals against Bayern Munich in 1989–90, Milan won 1–0 at home and were 0–1 down after 90 minutes in the second leg. Both teams scored one goal each in extra time, giving Milan the victory on away goals.
 In the round of 16 against Chelsea in 2014–15, Paris Saint-Germain drew 1–1 both home and away. Both teams scored one goal each in the extra time period played in London, giving Paris Saint-Germain the victory on away goals.
 In the round of 16 against Juventus in 2020–21 (the last season the away goals rule was used), Porto won 2–1 at home and were 1–2 down after 90 minutes in the second leg. Both teams scored one goal each in the extra time period played in Turin, giving Porto the victory on away goals.

Penalty shoot-out 

 The first penalty shoot-out in the European Cup was between Everton and Borussia Mönchengladbach on 4 November 1970, after both games ended 1–1. Gladbach's Klaus-Dieter Sieloff was the first player to score from a penalty kick, while Everton's Joe Royle was the first to miss. Everton went on to win 4–3 with Sandy Brown scoring the decisive goal.
 The first penalty shoot-out in a final was between Liverpool and Roma in the 1984 final following a 1–1 draw after extra time. Roma's Agostino Di Bartolomei was the first player to score, while Liverpool's Steve Nicol was the first to miss. Liverpool went on to win 4–2, with Alan Kennedy scoring the decisive penalty. Kennedy had also scored the winning goal in the 1981 final.
 Eleven finals have been decided by a penalty shoot-out. Liverpool is the only team to have won more than once (1984 and 2005), while Juventus, Milan, Bayern Munich and Chelsea have won one and lost one. No team has lost twice.
 Barcelona, Bayern Munich and Atlético Madrid are the only teams to have been involved in two penalty shoot-outs in the same season. In 1985–86, Barcelona beat IFK Göteborg in the semi-finals, but lost to Steaua București in the final. In 2011–12, Bayern Munich beat Real Madrid in the semi-finals, but lost to Chelsea in the final. In 2015–16, Atlético Madrid beat PSV Eindhoven in the round of 16, but lost to Real Madrid in the final.
 Games that ended with a penalty shoot-out in all-time of the tournament:
 Everton 4–3 Borussia Mönchengladbach (1970–71, second round)
 Celtic 4–5 Inter Milan (1971–72, semi-finals)
 Atvidabergs 3–4 Bayern Munich (1973–74, first round)
 Újpesti Dózsa 4–3 Spartak Trnava (1973–74, quarter-finals)
 1.FC Magdeburg 1–2 Malmö FF (1975–76, first round)
 Torpedo Moscow 1–4 Benfica (1977–78, first round)
 Juventus 3–0 Ajax (1977–78, quarter-finals)
 Dynamo Dresden 5–4 Partizan (1978–79, first round)
 Liverpool 4–2 Roma (1983–84, final)
 BFC Dynamo 5–4 Aberdeen (1984–85, first round)
 Dnipro Dnipropetrovsk 3–5 Bordeaux (1984–85, quarter-finals)
 Barcelona 5–4 IFK Göteborg (1985–86, semi-finals)
 Steaua București 2–0 Barcelona (1985–86, final)
 Juventus 1–3 Real Madrid (1986–87, second round)
 PSV Eindhoven 6–5 Benfica (1987–88, final)
 Neuchâtel Xamax 3–0 Larisa (1988–89, second round)
 Red Star Belgrade 2–4 Milan (1988–89, second round)
 Spartak Moscow 5–3 Napoli (1990–91, second round)
 Malmö FF 4–5 Dynamo Dresden (1990–91, second round)
 Red Star Belgrade 5–3 Marseille (1990–91, final)
 Ajax 2–4 Juventus (1995–96, final)
 Bayern Munich 5–4 Valencia (2000–01, final)	
 Juventus 2–3 Milan (2002–03, final)	
 PSV Eindhoven 4–2 Lyon (2004–05, quarter-finals)	
 Milan 2–3 Liverpool (2004–05, final)	
 Liverpool 4–1 Chelsea (2006–07, semi-finals)	
 Sevilla 2–3 Fenerbahçe (2007–08, round of 16)	
 Porto 1–4 Schalke 04 (2007–08, round of 16)	
 Manchester United 6–5 Chelsea (2007–08, final)	
 Roma 6–7 Arsenal (2008–09, round of 16)	
 APOEL 4–3 Lyon (2011–12, round of 16)	
 Real Madrid 1–3 Bayern Munich (2011–12, semi-finals)	
 Bayern Munich 3–4 Chelsea (2011–12, final)	
 Atlético Madrid 3–2 Bayer Leverkusen (2014–15, round of 16)	
 Atlético Madrid 8–7 PSV Eindhoven (2015–16, round of 16)	
 Real Madrid 5–3 Atlético Madrid (2015–16, final)	
 Two teams were involved in four penalty shoot-outs: Bayern Munich and Juventus.
 Liverpool (out of three) and Bayern Munich (out of four) are the only teams to have won three penalty shoot-outs.	
 Five teams have lost two penalty shoot-outs: Ajax (two out of two), Juventus (two out of four), Roma (two out of two), Chelsea (two out of three) and Lyon (two out of two). Ajax, Roma and Lyon are the only teams to have played in multiple shoot-outs and failed to have won one.

Extra time 
 Real Madrid have had 12 ties require extra time to be decided; nine of these were decided by the end of extra time, and three went to penalty shoot-outs.
 Four clubs have reached extra time in the final matches three times:
 Real Madrid (1958, 2014 and 2016)
 Milan (1958, 2003 and 2005)
 Bayern Munich (1974, 2001 and 2012)
 Atlético Madrid (1974, 2014 and 2016)
 Seventeen finals have gone to extra time. One was replayed and eleven went to a penalty shoot-out, while the remaining five were decided after 120 minutes:
 Real Madrid beat Milan 3–2 in 1958
 Manchester United beat Benfica 4–1 in 1968
 Feyenoord beat Celtic 2–1 in 1970
 Barcelona beat Sampdoria 1–0 in 1992
 Real Madrid beat Atlético Madrid 4–1 in 2014

Most goals in a match 
 The most goals scored in a single match across all European Cup/Champions League seasons is fourteen, which occurred when Feyenoord beat KR Reykjavík 12–2 in the first round in 1969–70.
 The most goals scored in a single match in the Champions League era is twelve, which occurred when Borussia Dortmund beat Legia Warsaw 8–4 in the group stage in 2016–17.
 Bayern Munich beat Barcelona 8–2 in the quarter-finals in 2019–20. With ten goals, this is the highest-scoring individual knockout game in the Champions League era.
 Real Madrid beat Eintracht Frankfurt 7–3 in the 1960 final. With ten goals, this is the highest-scoring final across both the European Cup and the Champions League.
 With six goals, a 3–3 draw between Milan and Liverpool in the 2005 final is the highest-scoring final in the Champions League era.

Highest scoring draws 
 The highest scoring draw in a European Cup/Champions League match had eight goals (four goals for each side), and occurred on five occasions:
 Vörös Lobogó 4–4 Reims in the 1955–56 quarter-finals
 Hamburger SV 4–4 Juventus in the 2000–01 first group stage
 Chelsea 4–4 Liverpool in the 2008–09 quarter-finals
 Bayer Leverkusen 4–4 Roma in the 2015–16 group stage
 Chelsea 4–4 Ajax in the 2019–20 group stage

More European Cups than domestic league titles 
 Nottingham Forest are the only club to have won the European Cup more times (twice) than they have won their own domestic league (once). Forest won the Football League in 1978, before winning the European Cup in 1979 and defending it in 1980. Nottingham Forest are also the only previous winners of the European Cup to be later relegated to the third tier of their national league (in 2005).

Not winning the domestic league 
 The competition format was changed in 1997–98 to allow teams that were not champions of their domestic league nor reigning title holders to compete in the tournament. Since then there have been European Champions who had neither been domestic nor continental champions:
 Manchester United's treble-winners of 1998–99 were the first winners of the tournament to have won neither their domestic title nor the European Cup/Champions League the previous season. Since then:
Real Madrid (1999–2000, 2013–14, 2015–16 and 2021–22) 
Milan (2002–03 and 2006–07) 
Liverpool (2004–05 and 2018–19)
 Liverpool's 2018–19 triumph came 29 years after their previous domestic league title (1989–90). This was the longest time any Champions League winner had gone since previously winning their league, breaking the record Liverpool set in 2004–05, which was fifteen years after their last league title.
Barcelona (2008–09 and 2014–15) 
Chelsea (2011–12 and 2020–21)
Bayern Munich (2012–13)
 Bayer Leverkusen (in 2002) is the only club to play in the final having never won their domestic league.
 There have been nine finals contested where both sides did not win their national league in the previous season:
 1999 – Manchester United (2nd) vs Bayern Munich (2nd)
 2000 – Real Madrid (2nd) vs Valencia (4th)
 2007 – Milan (3rd) vs Liverpool (3rd)
 2012 – Chelsea (2nd) vs Bayern Munich (3rd)
 2014 – Real Madrid (2nd) vs Atlético Madrid (3rd)
 2016 – Real Madrid (2nd) vs Atlético Madrid (3rd)
 2019 – Tottenham Hotspur (3rd) vs Liverpool (4th)
 2021 – Manchester City (2nd) vs Chelsea (4th)
 2022 – Liverpool (3rd) vs Real Madrid (2nd)

Comebacks

Group stage 
 Only two teams have progressed past the group stage after losing their first three games:
 Newcastle United in 2002–03: In Newcastle's final game against Feyenoord, Craig Bellamy's goal in the first minute of second-half stoppage time secured the 3–2 victory and a place in the second group stage.
 Atalanta in 2019–20: Atalanta managed to advance after losing their first three matches and drawing their fourth.
 Only fifteen teams have progressed past the group stage after losing their first two games. Of these sides, only Galatasaray, Tottenham Hotspur and Atalanta managed to advance past the second round of the tournament.
 Dynamo Kyiv in 1999–2000; lost on head-to-head criteria in second group stage to Real Madrid despite having a better goal difference
 Newcastle United and Bayer Leverkusen in 2002–03; placed 3rd and 4th in second group stage respectively
 Werder Bremen in 2005–06; lost to Juventus on away goals (4–4 agg.) in the round of 16
 Inter Milan in 2006–07; lost to Valencia on away goals (2–2 agg.) in the round of 16
 Lyon in 2007–08; lost 2–1 on aggregate to Manchester United in the round of 16
 Panathinaikos in 2008–09; came back to win the group but lost 3–2 on aggregate to Villarreal in the round of 16
 Marseille in 2010–11; lost 2–1 on aggregate to Manchester United in the round of 16
 Galatasaray in 2012–13; lost 5–3 on aggregate to Real Madrid in the quarter-finals
 Arsenal in 2015–16; lost 5–1 on aggregate to Barcelona in the round of 16
 Tottenham Hotspur in 2018–19; lost 2–0 to Liverpool in the final
 Atalanta in 2019–20; lost 2–1 to Paris Saint-Germain in the quarter-finals
 Sporting CP in 2021–22; lost 5–0 on aggregate to Manchester City in the round of 16
 Porto in 2022–23; lost 1–0 on aggregate to Inter Milan in the round of 16
 RB Leipzig in 2022–23; lost 8–1 on aggregate to Manchester City in the round of 16

 In 1994–95, defending champions Milan started the group stage with a loss and a win, but were deducted two points for crowd trouble against Casino Salzburg on matchday two. With zero points after two games, they still managed to advance from the group and later to the final, where they lost to Ajax.
 Only three teams have progressed past the group stage without winning any of their first five games:
 Juventus drew their first five games in 1998–99
 Feyenoord drew their first five games in 1999–2000
 Liverpool lost their first game and drew next four games in 2001–02 second group stage

 Only three teams have progressed past the group stage without winning any of their first four games:
 Lokomotiv Moscow lost three and drew one in 2002–03 (first group stage)
 Manchester City lost two and drew two in 2014–15
 Atalanta lost three and drew one in 2019–20

Two-leg knockout matches 
 Only one team has lost the first leg of a knockout match by four goals, but still managed to qualify for the next round:
Barcelona lost 4–0 to Paris Saint-Germain in the first leg of the round of 16 in 2016–17, but won 6–1 in the second leg to advance 6–5 on aggregate
 One additional team was trailing by four goals at some point in a knockout match, but still managed to qualify for the next round:
 Tottenham Hotspur were trailing 4–0 to Górnik Zabrze after 48 minutes of the first leg in the 1961–62 preliminary round, but managed to finish the game down 4–2 and won 8–1 in the second leg to advance 10–5 on aggregate
 Seventeen teams have lost the first leg of a knockout match by three goals, but still managed to qualify for the next round:
 
 Schalke 04 lost 3–0 to KB in the 1958–59 first round, but won 5–2 in the second leg and advanced after winning 3–1 in the play-off
 Jeunesse Esch lost 4–1 to Haka in the 1963–64 preliminary round, but won 4–0 in the second leg and advanced 5–4 on aggregate
 Partizan lost 4–1 to Sparta Prague in the 1965–66 quarter-finals, but won 5–0 in the second leg and advanced 6–4 on aggregate
 Panathinaikos lost 4–1 to Red Star Belgrade in the 1970–71 semi-finals, but won 3–0 in the second leg and advanced to the final on away goals
 Saint-Étienne lost 4–1 to Hajduk Split in the 1974–75 second round, but won 5–1 in the second leg and advanced 6–5 on aggregate
 Real Madrid lost 4–1 to Derby County in the 1975–76 second round, but won 5–1 in the second leg and advanced 6–5 on aggregate
 Barcelona lost 3–0 to Gothenburg in the 1985–86 semi-finals, but won 3–0 in the second leg and advanced after winning 5–4 on penalties
 Werder Bremen lost 3–0 to Dynamo Berlin in the 1988–89 first round, but won 5–0 in the second leg and advanced 5–3 on aggregate
 Galatasaray lost 3–0 to Neuchâtel Xamax in the 1988–89 second round, but won 5–0 in the second leg and advanced 5–3 on aggregate
 Leeds United lost 3–0 to VfB Stuttgart in the 1992–93 first round, but was awarded a 3–0 win in the second leg and advanced after winning 2–1 in the play-off
 Copenhagen lost 3–0 to Linfield in the 1993–94 first round, but won 4–0 after extra time in the second leg and advanced 4–3 on aggregate
 Paris Saint-Germain lost 3–0 to Steaua București in the 1997–98 second qualifying round, but won 5–0 in the second leg and advanced 5–3 on aggregate
 Widzew Łódź lost 4–1 to Litex Lovech in the 1999–2000 second qualifying round, but won 4–1 in the second leg and advanced after winning 3–2 on penalties
 KF Tirana lost 3–0 to Dinamo Tbilisi in the 2003–04 first qualifying round, but won 3–0 in the second leg and advanced after winning 4–2 on penalties
 Deportivo La Coruña lost 4–1 to Milan in the 2003–04 quarter-finals, but won 4–0 in the second leg and advanced 5–4 on aggregate
 Roma lost 4–1 to Barcelona in the 2017–18 quarter-finals, but won 3–0 in the second leg and advanced on away goals
 Liverpool lost 3–0 to Barcelona in the 2018–19 semi-finals, but won 4–0 in the second leg and advanced to the final 4–3 on aggregate
 Another 18 teams were trailing by three goals at some point in a knockout match, but still managed to qualify for the next round:
 Manchester United were trailing 0–3 to Athletic Bilbao after 43 minutes of the first leg in the quarter-final 1956–57, and then 2–5 after 78 minutes, but managed to finish the game 3–5 and won 3–0 in the second leg and 6–5 on aggregate.
 CCA București lost 2–4 to Borussia Dortmund in the first round 1957–58 and were trailing 0–1 (2–5 on aggregate) after 12 minutes of the second leg, but managed to win the game 3–1 to qualify for the next round on away goals.
 Hamburg were trailing 0–3 to Burnley after 74 minutes of the first leg in the quarter-final 1960–61, but managed to finish the game 1–3 and won 4–1 in the second leg and 5–4 on aggregate.
 Spartak Trnava were trailing 0–3 to Steaua București after 51 minutes of the first leg in the first round 1968–69, but managed to finish the game 1–3 and won 4–0 in the second leg and 5–3 on aggregate.
 Austria Wien were trailing 0–3 to Levski-Spartak after 62 minutes of the first leg in the preliminary round 1970–71, but managed to finish the game 1–3 and won 3–0 in the second leg and 4–3 on aggregate.
 Basel were trailing 0–3 to Spartak Moscow after 76 minutes of the first leg in the first round 1970–71, but managed to finish the game 2–3 and won 2–1 in the second leg to qualify on away goals.
 Anderlecht were trailing 0–3 to Slovan Bratislava after 44 minutes, and 1–4 after 63 minutes of the first leg in the preliminary round 1974–75, but managed to finish the game 2–4 and won 3–1 in the second leg to qualify on away goals.
 Saint-Étienne were trailing 0–3 to Ruch Chorzów after 46 minutes of the first leg in the quarter-final 1974–75, but managed to finish the game 2–3 and won 2–0 in the second leg and 4–3 on aggregate.
 Borussia Mönchengladbach were trailing 0–3 to Wacker Innsbruck after 27 minutes of the first leg in the quarter-final 1977–78, but managed to finish the game 1–3 and won 2–0 in the second leg to qualify on away goals.
 Banik Ostrava were trailing 0–3 to Ferencváros after 47 minutes of the first leg in the first round 1981–82, but managed to finish the game 2–3 and won 3–0 in the second leg and 5–3 on aggregate.
 Bayern Munich were trailing 0–3 to CSKA Sofia after 18 minutes of the first leg in the semi-final 1981–82, but managed to finish the game 3–4 and won 4–0 in the second leg and 7–4 on aggregate.
 Real Madrid were trailing 0–3 to Red Star Belgrade after 39 minutes of the first leg in the quarter-final 1986–87, but managed to finish the game 2–4 and won 2–0 in the second leg to qualify on away goals.
 Real Madrid were trailing 0–3 to Bayern Munich after 47 minutes of the first leg in the quarter-final 1987–88, but managed to finish the game 2–3 and won 2–0 in the second leg and 4–3 on aggregate.
 Sparta Prague were trailing 0–3 to Marseille after 60 minutes of the first leg in the second round 1991–92, but managed to finish the game 2–3 and won 2–1 in the second leg to qualify on away goals.
 Cork City were trailing 0–3 to Cwmbrân Town after 27 minutes of the first leg in the preliminary round 1993–94, but managed to finish the game 2–3 and won 2–1 in the second leg to qualify on away goals.
 Monaco were trailing 1–4 to Real Madrid after 81 minutes of the first leg in the quarter-final 2003–04, managed to finish the game 2–4, were trailing 0–1 (2–5 on aggregate) after 36 minutes of the second leg, but won 3–1 to qualify on away goals.
 Tottenham Hotspur were trailing 0–3 to Young Boys after 28 minutes of the first leg in the play-off round 2010–11, but managed to finish the game 2–3 and won 4–0 in the second leg and 6–3 on aggregate.
 Tottenham Hotspur were trailing 0–2 (0–3 on agg.) to Ajax after 35 minutes of the second leg in the semi-final 2018–19, but managed to win the game 3–2 to qualify on away goals after a 3–3 aggregate score.
 Four teams lost the first leg of a knockout match by three goals, overcame the deficit in the second leg, but still did not qualify for the next round:
 Rapid Wien lost 4–1 to Milan in the preliminary round 1957–58, won 5–2 in the second leg, but lost 4–2 in the play-off.
 Górnik Zabrze lost 4–1 to Dukla Prague in the preliminary round 1964–65, won 3–0 in the second leg, but lost the coin toss after the play-off ended 0–0.
 Benfica lost 3–0 to Celtic in the second round 1969–70, won 3–0 in the second leg, but lost the coin toss.
 Juventus lost their home leg of the 2017–18 quarter-finals to Real Madrid 0–3, but then proceeded to score three unanswered goals in the away game to put the aggregate score at 3–3 only to concede a last minute penalty and lose 3–4 on aggregate.
 Two teams were trailing by three goals at some point in a knockout match, overcame the deficit, but still did not qualify for the next round:
 Gothenburg were trailing 0–3 to Sparta Rotterdam after 48 minutes of the first leg in the round of 16 1959–60, but managed to finish the game 1–3 and won 3–1 in the second leg, only to lose 1–3 in the playoff.
 Red Star Belgrade lost 1–3 to Rangers in the preliminary round 1964–65 and were trailing 0–1 (1–4 on aggregate) after 40 minutes of the second leg, but managed to win the game 4–2, only to lose 1–3 in the playoff.
 Only one team has lost the first leg of a knockout match at home by two goals, but still managed to qualify for the next round:
 Manchester United lost 2–0 to Paris Saint-Germain in the first leg of the round of 16 in 2018–19 at Old Trafford, but won 3–1 in the second leg at the Parc des Princes to advance on away goals Including the European Cup era, only Ajax have additionally managed to achieve this feat; they lost 3–1 at home to Benfica in the first leg of the quarter-finals in 1968–69, but won 3–1 away in the second leg to force a play-off, which they won 3–0 after extra time
 On seven occasions, a team lost the first leg away from home 1–0 and was trailing 1–0 in the second leg at home, but managed to score the three goals required under the away goals rule and qualify for the next round:
 Celtic lost 1–0 away to Partizani in the 1979–80 first round and were trailing 1–0 (2–0 on aggregate, with Partizani also having an away goal) after 15 minutes of the second leg, but managed to win the game 4–1 and advance 4–2 on aggregate
 AEK Athens lost 1–0 away to Dynamo Dresden in the 1989–90 first round and were trailing 1–0 (2–0 on aggregate, with Dresden also having an away goal) after 10 minutes of the second leg, but managed to win the game 5–3 and advance 5–4 on aggregate
 PSV Eindhoven lost 1–0 away to Steaua București in the 1989–90 second round and were trailing 1–0 (2–0 on aggregate, with Steaua also having an away goal) after 17 minutes of the second leg, but managed to win the game 5–1 and advance 5–2 on aggregate
 Barcelona lost 1–0 away to Panathinaikos in the 2001–02 quarter-finals and were trailing 1–0 (2–0 on aggregate, with Panathinaikos also having an away goal) after eight minutes of the second leg, but managed to win the game 3–1 and advance 3–2 on aggregate
 Shakhtar Donetsk lost 1–0 away to Red Bull Salzburg in the 2007–08 third qualifying round and were trailing 1–0 (2–0 on aggregate, with Salzburg also having an away goal) after five minutes of the second leg, but managed to win the game 3–1 and advance 3–2 on aggregate
 BATE Borisov lost 1–0 away to Debrecen in the 2014–15 third qualifying round and were trailing 1–0 (2–0 on aggregate, with Debrecen also having an away goal) after 20 minutes of the second leg, but managed to win the game 3–1 and advance 3–2 on aggregate
 Real Madrid lost 1–0 away to Paris Saint-Germain in the 2021–22 round of 16 and were trailing 1–0 (2–0 on aggregate) after 39 minutes of the second leg, but managed to win the game 3–1 and advance 3–2 on aggregate (NB: in this particular instance, Real Madrid were not strictly required to score 3 goals, as the away goals rule had been discontinued; the tie is nevertheless mentioned here for the sake of consistency)

Single game 
 No team has ever managed to escape a loss in a single game after trailing by four or more goals.
 Teams have managed to win a game after trailing by three goals on three occasions:
 Werder Bremen were trailing 3–0 to Anderlecht after 33 minutes in the 1993–94 group stage, but managed to win the game 5–3
 Deportivo La Coruña were trailing 3–0 to Paris Saint-Germain after 55 minutes in the 2000–01 second group stage, but managed to win the game 4–3
 Maccabi Haifa were trailing 3–0 to Aktobe after 15 minutes in the 2009–10 third qualifying round second leg, but managed to win the game 4–3 and advance 4–3 on aggregate
 Teams have managed to tie a game after trailing by three goals on eleven occasions:
 Vörös Lobogó were trailing 4–1 to Reims after 52 minutes in the second leg of the 1955–56 quarter-finals, but managed to finish the game 4–4. However, Reims still advanced after winning 8–6 on aggregate
 Red Star Belgrade were trailing 3–0 to Manchester United after 31 minutes in the second leg of the 1957–58 quarter-finals, but managed to finish the game 3–3. However, Manchester United still advanced after winning 5–4 on aggregate
 Panathinaikos were trailing 3–0 to Linfield after 26 minutes in the second leg of the 1984–85 second round, but managed to finish the game 3–3 and advance 5–4 on aggregate
 Liverpool were trailing 3–0 to Basel after 29 minutes in the 2002–03 first group stage, but managed to finish the game 3–3
 Liverpool were trailing 3–0 to Milan after 44 minutes in the 2005 final, but managed to finish the game 3–3, and win the final 3–2 on penalties
 Maccabi Tel Aviv were trailing 3–0 to Basel after 32 minutes in the second leg of the 2013–14 third qualifying round, but managed to finish the game 3–3. However, Basel still advanced after winning 4–3 on aggregate
 Anderlecht were trailing 3–0 to Arsenal after 58 minutes in the 2014–15 group stage, but managed to finish the game 3–3
 Molde were trailing 3–0 to Dinamo Zagreb after 22 minutes in the second leg of the 2015–16 third qualifying round, but managed to finish the game 3–3. However, Dinamo Zagreb still advanced on away goals
 Beşiktaş were trailing 3–0 to Benfica after 31 minutes in the 2016–17 group stage, but managed to finish the game 3–3
 Sevilla were trailing 3–0 to Liverpool after 30 minutes in the 2017–18 group stage, but managed to finish the game 3–3
 Chelsea were trailing 4–1 to Ajax after 55 minutes in the 2019–20 group stage, but managed to finish the game 4–4

Defence 

 Arsenal hold the record for the most consecutive clean sheets in the competition, with ten during the 2005–06 season. They did not concede a goal for 995 minutes between September 2005 and May 2006. The run started after Markus Rosenberg's goal for Ajax in the 71st minute of matchday 2 of the group stage, continued with four group stage games and six games in the knockout rounds, and ended with Samuel Eto'o's goal for Barcelona after 76 minutes in the final. These minutes were split between two goalkeepers: Jens Lehmann (648 minutes) and Manuel Almunia (347 minutes).
 Aston Villa (in 9 matches in 1981–82) and Milan (in 12 matches in 1993–94) hold the record for the fewest goals conceded by a Champions League-winning team, conceding only two goals. In addition, Milan achieved the lowest-ever goals conceded-per-game ratio for Champions League-winning in the history of the competition (0.16).
 Real Madrid hold the record for the most goals conceded by a Champions League-winning team, conceding 23 goals in 17 matches in 1999–2000. 
 Benfica achieved the highest-ever goals conceded-per-game ratio for Champions League-winning in the history of the competition (1.57), the club conceded 11 goals in 7 matches in 1961–62.
 Manchester United holds the record for the longest run without conceding from the start of a campaign, with 481 minutes in the 2010–11 season. The run ended with Pablo Hernández's goal for Valencia after 32 minutes on matchday 6 of the group stage. 
 That season, the club also became the only side to play six away games in a single Champions League campaign without conceding a goal.

Goalscoring records 
 Barcelona holds the record for most goals in a season, with the club scoring 45 goals in 16 matches in 1999–2000. Including qualifying stages, Liverpool holds this feat, scoring 47 goals in 15 matches in 2017–18.
 Bayern Munich hold the record for most goals by a Champions League-winning side, scoring 43 goals in 11 matches in 2019–20. Additionally, the club achieved the highest-ever goal-per-game ratio in the history of the competition (3.91).
 PSV Eindhoven hold the record for fewest goals by a Champions League-winning, scoring 9 goals in 9 matches in 1987–88. Additionally, the club achieved the lowest-ever goal-per-game ratio in the history of the competition (1).
 Real Madrid is the first club to reach the 1000th goal in the history of the competition, doing so when Karim Benzema scored the first goal in the 14th minute in his team's 2–1 victory against Shakhtar Donetsk in the fourth matchday of the group stage in the 2021–22 season.

Meetings 
 Bayern Munich and Real Madrid played each other on a record 26 occasions. 
 Fellow English clubs Liverpool and Chelsea played each other in a record five consecutive seasons between 2004–05 and 2008–09 editions, while Spanish sides Real Madrid and Atlético Madrid also played each other for four consecutive seasons between 2013–14 and 2016–17, including the 2014 and 2016 finals.

Penalties 
 Real Madrid is the club with the most penalties awarded in the Champions League, with 56.
 Real Madrid is the club with the most penalties conceded in the Champions League, with 26.
 The match between Sevilla and Red Bull Salzburg in the 2021–22 group stage had a record four penalties awarded (three for Salzburg and one for Sevilla), of which two were scored.
 The 2001 final is the final with the highest number of penalties in the history of the tournament, as three penalties were awarded, of which two were scored.
 Seventeen penalties have been taken in the final of the tournament, of which twelve have been scored and five have been missed:
  1957: by Alfredo Di Stéfano in the 69th minute for Real Madrid, against Fiorentina
  1959: by Enrique Mateos in the 16th minute for Real Madrid, against Reims
  1960: by Ferenc Puskás in the 56th minute for Real Madrid, against Eintracht Frankfurt
  1962: by Eusébio in the 64th minute for Benfica, against Real Madrid
  1967: by Sandro Mazzola in the 7th minute for Inter Milan, against Celtic
  1969: by Velibor Vasović in the 60th minute for Ajax, against Milan
  1977: by Phil Neal in the 82nd minute for Liverpool, against Borussia Mönchengladbach
  1985: by Michel Platini in the 58th minute for Juventus, against Liverpool
  2001: by Gaizka Mendieta in the 2nd minute for Valencia, against Bayern Munich
  2001: by Mehmet Scholl in the 5th minute for Bayern Munich, against Valencia
  2001: by Stefan Effenberg in the 50th minute for Bayern Munich, against Valencia
  2005: by Xabi Alonso in the 60th minute for Liverpool, against Milan
  2012: by Arjen Robben in the 95th minute for Bayern Munich, against Chelsea
  2013: by İlkay Gündoğan in the 68th minute for Borussia Dortmund, against Bayern Munich
  2014: by Cristiano Ronaldo in the 120th minute for Real Madrid, against Atlético Madrid
  2016: by Antoine Griezmann in the 47th minute for Atlético Madrid, against Real Madrid
  2019: by Mohamed Salah in the 2nd minute for Liverpool, against Tottenham Hotspur

Defending the trophy 
 A total of 67 tournaments have been played: 37 in the European Cup era (1955–56 to 1991–92) and 30 in the Champions League era (1992–93 to 2021–22). 15 of the 66 attempts to defend the trophy (22.73%) have been successful, split between eight teams. These are:
 Real Madrid on six attempts out of thirteen (1956–57, 1957–58, 1958–59, 1959–60, 2016–17, 2017–18)
 Benfica on one attempt out of two (1961–62)
 Inter Milan on one attempt out of three (1964–65)
 Ajax on two attempts out of four (1971–72, 1972–73)
 Bayern Munich on two attempts out of six (1974–75, 1975–76)
 Liverpool on one attempt out of six (1977–78)
 Nottingham Forest on one attempt out of two (1979–80)
 Milan on one attempt out of seven (1989–90)
 Between the two eras of this competition, this breaks down as:
 Of the 36 attempts in European Cup era: 13 successful (36.1%)
 Of the 30 attempts in the Champions League era: 2 successful (6.67%)
 Only one team has managed to defend the trophy in the Champions League era: Real Madrid (twice), who won in 2015–16, 2016–17 and 2017–18.
The teams who came closest to defending the trophy but who were unsuccessful, all making it to the final:
 Benfica in 1962–63
 Liverpool in 1984–85
 Milan in 1994–95
 Ajax in 1995–96
 Juventus in 1996–97
 Manchester United in 2008–09
 Of the 22 teams that have won the trophy, 14 have never defended it. Only five of these have won the trophy more than once, and so have had more than one attempt to do so. These are:
 Barcelona on five attempts: lost to CSKA Moscow in the second round in 1992–93, to Liverpool in the round of 16 in 2006–07, to Inter Milan in the semi-finals in 2009–10, to Chelsea in the semi-finals in 2011–12, and to Atlético Madrid in the quarter-finals in 2015–16
 Manchester United on three attempts: lost to Milan in the semi-finals in 1968–69, to Real Madrid in the quarter-finals in 1999–2000, and to Barcelona in the final in 2008–09
 Juventus on two attempts: lost to Barcelona in the quarter-finals in 1985–86, and to Borussia Dortmund in the final in 1996–97
 Porto on two attempts: lost to Real Madrid in the second round in 1987–88, and to Inter Milan in the round of 16 in 2004–05
 Chelsea on two attempts: finished behind Juventus and Shakhtar Donetsk in the group stage in 2012–13, and lost to Real Madrid in the quarter-finals in 2021–22
 During the Champions League era, only one title holder has failed to qualify from the group stage:
 Chelsea in 2012–13
 Marseille were denied the opportunity to defend their title in 1993–94, following their punishment due to the French football bribery scandal.
Two teams lost consecutive finals:
 Juventus (1997 and 1998)
 Valencia (2000 and 2001)
 Three teams won the tournament after losing the final in the previous season:
 Milan (1993–94)
 Bayern Munich (2012–13)
 Liverpool (2018–19)
 Inter Milan's 2009–10 triumph came 45 years after winning their previous title (1964–65). This was the longest time any Champions League winner had gone since previously winning the tournament.

Disciplinary 
 Juventus hold the record for the most red cards (28).

Own goals 
 Real Madrid hold the record for most own goals scored, with 12.
 The match between Astana and Galatasaray in the 2015–16 group stage holds the record for the most own goals scored, with 3.

Finals 
 Only one pair of teams have played each other in three finals:
 Real Madrid against Liverpool (lost 0–1 in 1981, won 3–1 in 2018, won 1–0 in 2022)
 Eight other pairs of teams have played each other in two finals:
 Real Madrid against Reims (won 4–3 in 1956 and won 2–0 in 1959)
 Milan against Benfica (won 2–1 in 1963 and won 1–0 in 1990)
 Milan against Ajax (won 4–1 in 1969 and lost 0–1 in 1995)
 Ajax against Juventus (won 1–0 in 1973 and lost 1–1 (2–4 on penalties) in 1996)
 Liverpool against Milan (won 3–3 (3–2 on penalties) in 2005 and lost 1–2 in 2007)
 Barcelona against Manchester United (won 2–0 in 2009 and won 3–1 in 2011)
 Real Madrid against Atlético Madrid (won 4–1  in 2014 and won 1–1 (5–3 on penalties) in 2016)
 Real Madrid against Juventus (won 1–0 in 1998 and won 4–1 in 2017)
 With the exception of the first final of the tournament, nine other finals were played where neither team had previously won the tournament:
 1961: Benfica vs Barcelona
 1971: Ajax vs Panathinaikos
 1974: Bayern Munich vs Atletico Madrid
 1977: Liverpool vs Borussia Mönchengladbach
 1979: Nottingham Forest vs Malmö FF
 1983: Hamburger SV vs Juventus
 1986: Steaua București vs Barcelona
 1991: Red Star Belgrade vs Marseille
 1992: Barcelona vs Sampdoria
 On eight occasions, but never in the final, has there been a rematch of the previous season's final at some point in the following season's competition:
 1977–78: Liverpool vs Borussia Mönchengladbach (semi-finals)
 1996–97: Juventus vs Ajax (semi-finals)
 2010–11: Inter Milan vs Bayern Munich (round of 16)
 2014–15: Real Madrid vs Atlético Madrid (quarter-finals)
 2016–17: Real Madrid vs Atlético Madrid (semi-finals)
 2017–18: Real Madrid vs Juventus (quarter-finals)
 2020–21: Bayern Munich vs Paris Saint-Germain (quarter-finals)
 2022–23: Liverpool vs Real Madrid (round of 16)
 Paris Saint-Germain in 2021 are the only side to lose the initial final but win the rematch, doing so on away goals.
 In only two seasons, the eventual finalists already met on previous stages, in particular in the group stage:
 In 1994–95, Ajax and Milan met in the group stage and later in the final. Ajax won all three matches (2–0 both home and away in the group stage, 1–0 in the final).
 In the 1998–99 edition, eventual winners Manchester United met Bayern Munich twice in the group stage (both draws) and later in the final.

Nationalities 
Three clubs have won the European Cup/Champions League fielding teams from a single nationality:
 Benfica twice won the competition (1961 and 1962) with a team consisting entirely of Portuguese players, although some of them had been born in Portuguese African colonies, then Overseas Provinces of Portugal but now independent nations.
 Celtic won the competition in 1967 with their entire squad born within a 30-mile radius of Celtic Park, their home ground.
 Steaua București won in 1986 with a team consisting entirely of players from Romania.
 Arsenal are believed to be the first club in Champions League history to have fielded 11 players of different nationalities at the same time, in their 2–1 win away at Hamburger SV on 13 September 2006. The Arsenal team, after the 28th-minute substitution of Kolo Touré, was: Jens Lehmann (Germany), Emmanuel Eboué (Ivory Coast), Johan Djourou (Switzerland), Justin Hoyte (England), William Gallas (France), Tomáš Rosický (Czech Republic), Gilberto Silva (Brazil), Cesc Fàbregas (Spain), Alexander Hleb (Belarus), Emmanuel Adebayor (Togo) and Robin van Persie (Netherlands).

Countries 
 On eight occasions has the final of the tournament involved two teams from the same nation:
  2000: Real Madrid 3–0 Valencia
  2003: Milan 0–0  Juventus
  2008: Manchester United 1–1  Chelsea
  2013: Bayern Munich 2–1 Borussia Dortmund
  2014: Real Madrid 4–1  Atlético Madrid
  2016: Real Madrid 1–1  Atlético Madrid
  2019: Liverpool 2–0 Tottenham Hotspur
  2021: Chelsea 1–0 Manchester City
 In addition to the eight finals, 29 meetings between teams from the same league have been played:
 Twelve meetings from the English league:
 1978–79: Nottingham Forest 2–0 Liverpool, first round (2–0, 0–0)
 2003–04: Chelsea 3–2 Arsenal, quarter-finals (1–1, 2–1)
 2004–05: Liverpool 1–0 Chelsea, semi-finals (0–0, 1–0)
 2005–06: Liverpool 0–0 Chelsea, group stage (0–0, 0–0)
 2006–07: Liverpool 1–1 (4–1 pen.) Chelsea, semi-finals (1–0, 0–1)
 2007–08: Liverpool 5–3 Arsenal, quarter-finals (1–1, 4–2)
 2007–08: Chelsea 4–3 Liverpool, semi-finals (1–1, 3–2)
 2008–09: Chelsea 7–5 Liverpool, quarter-finals (3–1, 4–4)
 2008–09: Manchester United 4–1 Arsenal, semi-finals (1–0, 3–1)
 2010–11: Manchester United 3–1 Chelsea, quarter-finals (1–0, 2–1)
 2017–18: Liverpool 5–1 Manchester City, quarter-finals (3–0, 2–1)
 2018–19: Tottenham Hotspur 4–4 Manchester City, quarter-finals (1–0, 3–4, Tottenham Hotspur won on away goals)
 Eleven meetings from the Spanish league:
 1957–58: Real Madrid 10–2 Sevilla, quarter-finals (8–0, 2–2)
 1958–59: Real Madrid 2–2 (2–1 in play-off) Atlético Madrid, semi-finals (2–1, 0–1)
 1959–60: Real Madrid 6–2 Barcelona, semi-finals (3–1, 3–1)
 1960–61: Barcelona 4–3 Real Madrid, first round (2–2, 2–1)
 1999–2000: Valencia 5–3 Barcelona, semi-finals (4–1, 1–2)
 2001–02: Real Madrid 3–1 Barcelona, semi-finals (2–0, 1–1)
 2010–11: Barcelona 3–1 Real Madrid, semi-finals (2–0, 1–1)
 2013–14: Atlético Madrid 2–1 Barcelona, quarter-finals (1–1, 1–0)
 2014–15: Real Madrid 1–0 Atlético Madrid, quarter-finals (0–0, 1–0)
 2015–16: Atlético Madrid 3–2 Barcelona, quarter-finals (1–2, 2–0)
 2016–17: Real Madrid 4–2 Atlético Madrid, semi-finals (3–0, 1–2)
 Four meetings from the Italian league:
 1985–86: Juventus 2–0 Hellas Verona, second round (0–0, 2–0)
 2002–03: Milan 1–1 Inter Milan, semi-finals (0–0, 1–1, Milan won on "away" goals)
 2004–05: Milan 5–0 Inter Milan, quarter-finals (2–0, 3–0 (match awarded))
 2022–23: Milan vs. Napoli, quarter-finals 
 Two meetings from the Bundesliga:
 1997–98: Borussia Dortmund 1–0 Bayern Munich, quarter-finals (0–0, 1–0)
 1998–99: Bayern Munich 6–0 1. FC Kaiserslautern, quarter-finals (2–0, 4–0)
 In addition were two meetings between teams from the West German Bundesliga and the East German DDR-Oberliga:
 1974–75: Bayern Munich 5–3 Magdeburg, second round (3–2, 2–1)
 1988–89: Werder Bremen 5–3 BFC Dynamo, first round (0–3, 5–0)
 One meeting from the French league:
 2009–10: Lyon 3–2 Bordeaux, quarter-finals (3–1, 0–1)
 Germany has provided the highest number of participants in the history of the competition (including West and East Germany), including the qualifying stages, with 27 clubs:
 Rot-Weiss Essen, Borussia Dortmund, Wismut Karl Marx Stadt, Schalke 04, ASK Vorwärts Berlin, Eintracht Frankfurt, Hamburger SV, 1. FC Nürnberg, Carl Zeiss Jena, Chemie Leipzig, 1. FC Köln, Werder Bremen, 1860 Munich, Eintracht Braunschweig, Borussia Mönchengladbach, Dynamo Dresden, Bayern Munich, 1. FC Magdeburg, BFC Dynamo, VfB Stuttgart, Hansa Rostock, 1. FC Kaiserslautern, Bayer Leverkusen, Hertha BSC, VfL Wolfsburg, RB Leipzig and 1899 Hoffenheim
 Three nations have provided the highest number of participants in the competition in one season, including the qualifying stages, with five each:
 England (twice) in 2005–06 (Arsenal, Chelsea, Everton, Liverpool and Manchester United) and 2017–18 (Chelsea, Liverpool, Manchester City, Manchester United and Tottenham Hotspur)
 Spain (three times) in 2015–16 (Atlético Madrid, Barcelona, Real Madrid, Sevilla and Valencia), 2016–17 and 2021–22 (Atlético Madrid, Barcelona, Real Madrid, Sevilla and Villarreal)
 Germany in 2022–23 (Bayer Leverkusen, Bayern Munich, Borussia Dortmund, Eintracht Frankfurt and RB Leipzig)
 In all of the above occasions, except England in 2005–06 and Spain in 2016–17, all five teams appeared in the group stage.
 In 2017–18, England became the first nation to have five representatives in the knockout phase: Chelsea, Liverpool, Manchester City, Manchester United and Tottenham Hotspur.
 In 2007–08, England became the first nation to have four representatives in the quarter-finals: Arsenal, Chelsea, Liverpool and Manchester United. This feat was repeated by the same four teams in the 2008–09 season, and by Liverpool, Manchester City, Manchester United and Tottenham Hotspur in 2018–19.
 Three nations have provided the highest number of representatives in the semi-finals in one season with three each:
 Spain in 1999–2000 (Real Madrid, Barcelona and Valencia)
 Italy in 2002–03 (Inter Milan, Milan and Juventus)
 England (three times) in 2006–07, 2007–08 (Manchester United, Chelsea and Liverpool) and 2008–09 (Manchester United, Chelsea and Arsenal)
 Spanish teams have won the most titles, with nineteen victories shared among two teams: Real Madrid (fourteen) and Barcelona (five).
 Spanish teams provided the highest number of representatives in the finals, with thirty (seventeen for Real Madrid, eight for Barcelona, three for Atlético Madrid and two for Valencia).
 England has provided the most individual winners of the tournament, with five: Liverpool, Manchester United, Nottingham Forest, Aston Villa and Chelsea.
 England has also provided the highest number of different finalists, with nine: the five winners, plus Leeds United, Arsenal, Tottenham Hotspur and Manchester City.
 England has also provided the highest number of different semi-finalists, with ten: the nine finalists, plus Derby County.
 England has the most consecutive titles, with its clubs winning the title in 6 consecutive seasons from 1976–77 to 1981–82. Spain is followed by five consecutive seasons on two occasions, from 1955–56 to 1959–60 and from 2013–14 to 2017–18, then the Netherlands in four consecutive years from 1969–70 to 1972–73.
 In the 1989–90 season, Italian clubs won all three of Europe's three major competitions: the European Cup (Milan), the European Cup Winners' Cup (Sampdoria) and the UEFA Cup (Juventus). Juventus faced another side from Italy, Fiorentina, in the 1990 UEFA Cup Final. 
 In the 2018–19 season, England became the first nation to have all the final places in Europe's two major competitions: Liverpool and Tottenham Hotspur in the 2019 UEFA Champions League Final, and Arsenal and Chelsea in the 2019 UEFA Europa League Final.

Cities 
 On two occasions has the final of the tournament involved two teams from the same city:
 2014 (Madrid): Real Madrid vs Atlético Madrid
 2016 (Madrid): Real Madrid vs Atlético Madrid
 Milan is the only city with two teams who have won the competition: Inter Milan (1964, 1965, 2010) and Milan (1963, 1969, 1989, 1990, 1994, 2003, 2007).
 London is the only city to have been represented by three teams in the final: Arsenal (runners-up in 2006), Chelsea (runners-up in 2008, winners in 2012 and 2021) and Tottenham Hotspur (runners-up in 2019).
 Apart from Milan and London, three other cities have been represented by two teams in the final:
 Madrid has been represented by two clubs in eighteen finals, with fourteen wins (1956, 1957, 1958, 1959, 1960, 1966, 1998, 2000, 2002, 2014, 2016, 2017, 2018, 2022) and three losses (1962, 1964, 1981) for Real Madrid, and three losses for Atlético Madrid (1974, 2014, 2016).
 Belgrade has been represented by Partizan (runners-up in 1966) and Red Star Belgrade (winners in 1991).
 Manchester has been represented by Manchester United (winners in 1968, 1999, and 2008 and runners-up in 2009 and 2011) and Manchester City (runners-up in 2021).
 Only two cities have been represented in the group stage by three teams in the same season:
Athens: Olympiacos, Panathinaikos and AEK Athens in 2003–04
London: Chelsea, Arsenal, and Tottenham Hotspur in 2010–11
 Only one city has been represented in the knockout phase by three teams in the same season: London in 2010–11, when Arsenal, Chelsea and Tottenham Hotspur all progressed to the first knockout round.
 Istanbul is the only city to have been represented in the group stage by four teams: Beşiktaş, Fenerbahçe, Galatasaray and İstanbul Başakşehir.
 England is the only nation with teams from five cities who have won the competition:
 Liverpool: Liverpool
 Manchester: Manchester United
 Nottingham: Nottingham Forest
 Birmingham: Aston Villa
 London: Chelsea
 Apart from the two finals, only six other derbies between teams of the same city have ever been played:
 1958–59 (Madrid): Real Madrid vs Atlético Madrid (semi-finals)
 2002–03 (Milan): Inter Milan vs Milan (semi-finals)
 2003–04 (London): Chelsea vs Arsenal (quarter-finals)
 2004–05 (Milan): Inter Milan vs Milan (quarter-finals) (the second leg was abandoned and awarded to Milan due to disturbances from the Inter fans)
 2014–15 (Madrid): Real Madrid vs Atlético Madrid (quarter-finals)
 2016–17 (Madrid): Real Madrid vs Atlético Madrid (semi-finals)
 The 2002–03 semi-final tie between Milan and Inter Milan was the first time both games of a two-legged tie were played in the same stadium (San Siro), as the teams shared the stadium as their home venue. Milan won via the "away goals" rule. The teams also played each other in the same stadium in the 2004–05 quarter-finals. 
 The same situation occurred three times in the 2020–21 season, due to travel restrictions related to the COVID-19 pandemic: two round of 16 ties (RB Leipzig vs Liverpool and Borussia Mönchengladbach vs Manchester City) saw both legs played at the Puskás Aréna in Budapest (Leipzig and Borussia were the designated "home" teams for the first legs, and Liverpool and Manchester City were for the second), while the quarter-final tie between Porto and Chelsea saw both legs played at the Ramón Sánchez Pizjuán in Seville (Porto were the designated "home" team for the first leg, and Chelsea were for the second).

Specific group stage records 
 Most goals scored in a group stage: 25
 Paris Saint-Germain (2017–18)
 Fewest goals scored in a group stage: 0
 Deportivo La Coruña (2004–05)
 Maccabi Haifa (2009–10)
 Dinamo Zagreb (2016–17)
 Fewest goals conceded in a group stage: 1
 Milan (1992–93)
 Ajax (1995–96)
 Juventus (1996–97 and 2004–05)
 Villarreal (2005–06)
 Liverpool (2005–06)
 Chelsea (2005–06)
 Manchester United (2010–11)
 Monaco (2014–15)
 Paris Saint-Germain (2015–16)
 Barcelona (2017–18)
 Manchester City (2020–21)
 Most goals conceded in a group stage: 24
 BATE Borisov (2014–15)
 Legia Warsaw (2016–17)
 Viktoria Plzeň (2022–23)
 Highest goal difference in a group stage: +21
 Paris Saint-Germain (2017–18)
 Lowest goal difference in a group stage: –22
 BATE Borisov (2014–15)
 Lowest goal difference while winning a group: –3
 Sturm Graz (2000–01) (first group stage)
 Anderlecht (2000–01) (first group stage)
 Lowest number of points while winning a group: 8
 Juventus (1998–99)
 Highest goal difference while being last in the group: +3
 Monaco (2000–01) (first group stage)
 Highest number of points while being last in the group: 7
 Ajax (1998–99)
 Monaco (2000–01) (first group stage)
 Juventus (2001–02) (second group stage)
 Deportivo La Coruña (2002–03) (second group stage)
 Anderlecht (2003–04)
 Dynamo Kyiv (2003–04)
 Copenhagen (2006–07)
 CSKA Moscow (2018–19)
 Zenit Saint Petersburg (2019–20)

Six wins 

Eight clubs have won all six of their games in a group stage, on eleven occasions. Bayern Munich have done so the most, on three occasions, and are also the only club to have two consecutive six-win group stages.
 Milan, 1992–93 (reached the final) 
 Paris Saint-Germain, 1994–95 (reached the semi-finals)
 Spartak Moscow, 1995–96 (reached the quarter-finals)
 Barcelona, 2002–03 (first group stage) (reached the quarter-finals)
 Real Madrid has achieved this feat twice, in 2011–12 and 2014–15 (reached the semi-finals on both occasions)
 Bayern Munich has achieved this feat thrice, in 2019–20 (became the first team to win the tournament after sweeping the group stage), 2021–22 (reached the quarter-finals) and 2022–23
 Liverpool, 2021–22 (reached the final)
 Ajax, 2021–22 (reached the round of 16)

Six draws 
Only one club has drawn all six of their games in a group stage:
 AEK Athens, 2002–03 (first group stage, finished 3rd and advanced to the UEFA Cup, where they were eliminated in the fourth round by Málaga)

Six losses 
In the history of the Champions League, the following 23 clubs have lost all six group stage matches, Dinamo Zagreb is the only team to do it twice:
 Košice (1997–98) ended Group B conceding thirteen goals and scoring only twice, with a goal difference of –11.
 Fenerbahçe (2001–02, first group stage) ended Group F conceding twelve goals and scoring three, with a goal difference of –9.
 Spartak Moscow (2002–03, first group stage) ended Group B conceding eighteen goals and scoring only once, with a goal difference of –17.
 Bayer Leverkusen (2002–03, second group stage) ended Group A conceding fifteen goals and scoring five, with a goal difference of –10. This was the only time that a club lost all matches in the second group stage. It was also the first time that two clubs lost six group stage matches in the same season. Leverkusen had reached the final in the previous season.
 Anderlecht (2004–05) ended Group G conceding seventeen goals and scoring four, with a goal difference of –13.
 Rapid Wien (2005–06) ended Group A conceding fifteen goals and scoring three, with a goal difference of –12.
 Levski Sofia (2006–07) ended Group A conceding seventeen goals and scoring only once, with a goal difference of –16. This has been the club's only appearance in the group stage to date.
 Dynamo Kyiv (2007–08) ended Group F conceding nineteen goals and scoring four, with a goal difference of –15.
 Maccabi Haifa (2009–10) was the first club to lose all of their group stage matches without scoring a goal. In what was only their second appearance in the competition, they lost 3–0 to Bayern Munich in their first Group A game, and then lost five consecutive games by a score of 1–0, ending the group stage with a goal difference of –8. Although Deportivo La Coruña also scored no goals in Group A in 2004–05, they still collected two points as they twice drew 0–0.
 Debrecen (2009–10) ended Group E conceding nineteen goals and scoring five, with a goal difference of –14.
 Partizan (2010–11) ended Group H conceding thirteen goals and scoring only twice, with a goal difference of –11.
 MŠK Žilina (2010–11) ended Group F conceding nineteen goals and scoring three, with a goal difference of –16. This was the second consecutive season that two clubs had lost all six group stage matches.
 Dinamo Zagreb (2011–12) ended Group D conceding 22 goals and scoring three, with a goal difference of –19.
 Villarreal (2011–12) ended Group A conceding fourteen goals and scoring only twice, with a goal difference of –12.
 Oțelul Galați (2011–12) ended Group C conceding eleven goals and scoring three, with a goal difference of –8. This was the first season in which three teams lost all six of their group stage matches, and a third consecutive season in which at least two teams finished with zero points.
 Marseille (2013–14) ended Group F conceding fourteen goals and scoring five, with a goal difference of –9.
 Maccabi Tel Aviv (2015–16) ended Group G conceding sixteen goals and scoring only once, with a goal difference of –15. Tel-Aviv's only goal came from a penalty.
 Club Brugge (2016–17) ended Group G conceding fourteen goals and scoring only twice, with a goal difference of –12.
 Dinamo Zagreb (2016–17) ended Group H conceding fifteen goals and scoring none, with a goal difference of –15. They became the first club to finish the group stage with zero points on multiple occasions.
 Benfica (2017–18) ended Group A conceding fourteen goals and scoring only once, with a goal difference of –13. They became the first team from Pot 1 to lose all six group stage matches.
 AEK Athens (2018–19) ended Group E conceding thirteen goals and scoring only twice, with a goal difference of –11.
 Beşiktaş (2021–22) ended Group C conceding nineteen goals and scoring only three, with a goal difference of –16.
 Rangers (2022–23) ended Group A conceding 22 goals and scoring only two, with a goal difference of –20, which constituted the worst goal difference out of all the performances with losses in all six games.
 Viktoria Plzeň (2022–23) ended Group C conceding 24 goals and scoring five, with a goal difference of –19. This equalled the record for most goals conceded in a group stage.

Two goals in each match 
Six teams have managed to score at least two goals in each match of the group stage, on nine occasions:
 On 7 December 2010, Tottenham Hotspur drew 3–3 against Twente and became the first team to achieve this feat.
 Bayern Munich equalled this accomplishment the very next day, after beating Basel 3–0. On 11 December 2019, Bayern won 3–1 against Tottenham to achieve this feat for a second time. On 8 December 2021, Bayern won 3–0 against Barcelona to achieve this feat for a record third time. Bayern achieved this for a fourth time after defeating Inter Milan 2–0 on 1 November 2022, becoming the first team to achieve this feat in two consecutive seasons.
 Barcelona managed to accomplish this feat on 6 December 2011, after defeating BATE Borisov 4–0.
 Real Madrid achieved this feat by beating Copenhagen 2–0 on 10 December 2013. On 7 December 2016, Madrid drew 2–2 against Borussia Dortmund to accomplish this for a second time.
 Ajax managed to accomplish this feat on 7 December 2021, after defeating Sporting CP 4–2.
 Liverpool accomplished this on the same day as Ajax, after defeating Milan 2–1.

Advancing past the group stage 
 Real Madrid hold the record for the most consecutive seasons in which a side have advanced past the group stage, with 26 straight progressions from 1997–98 to 2022–23. During the first seven of these seasons (1997–98 to 2003–04), they reached at least the quarter-finals, winning the tournament three times. After this followed six consecutive seasons (2004–05 to 2009–10) in which they lost in the first knockout round (round of 16). Real Madrid then advanced to eight consecutive semi-finals (2010–11 to 2017–18), winning the tournament four times, before going out in the round of 16 in the 2018–19 and 2019–20 seasons, and the semi-finals in the 2020–21 season. They would lift the trophy again in 2021–22.
 Barcelona finished top of their group for a record thirteen consecutive seasons from 2007–08 to 2019–20, and in 18 seasons in total.
 In 2012–13, Chelsea became the first title holders not to qualify from the following season's group stage.
 Monaco scored the fewest goals (four) to earn eleven points in the group stage in 2014–15. Villarreal won a group with the fewest goals scored (three) in 2005–06, resulting in two wins.

Biggest disparity between group winner and runner-up 

The biggest points difference between the first- and second-placed teams in a Champions League group phase is eleven points, achieved by four teams:
 Real Madrid, 18 points (16:2 goals, +14 GD) in 2014–15 (2nd Basel 7 points, 3rd Liverpool 5 points, 4th Ludogorets Razgrad 4 points). Real Madrid ultimately lost to Juventus in the semi-finals.
 Liverpool, 18 points (17:6 goals, +11 GD) in 2021–22 (2nd Atlético Madrid 7 points, 3rd Porto 5 points, 4th Milan 4 points). Liverpool would go on to lose to Real Madrid in the final.
 Spartak Moscow, 18 points (15:4 goals, +11 GD) in 1995–96 (2nd Legia Warsaw 7 points, 3rd Rosenborg 6 points, 4th Blackburn Rovers 4 points). Spartak Moscow lost to Nantes in the next round (quarter-finals).
 Barcelona, 18 points (13:4 goals, +9 GD) in 2002–03 (first group stage) (2nd Lokomotiv Moscow 7 points, 3rd Club Brugge 5 points, 4th Galatasaray 4 points). Barcelona went on to win their group in the second group stage with sixteen points, but lost to Juventus in the quarter-finals.

Most points achieved, yet knocked out 
 Paris Saint-Germain, 12 points in 1997–98 (ranked third out of six runners-up, only two advanced)
 Napoli, 12 points in 2013–14
 Rosenborg, 11 points in 1997–98 (ranked fourth out of six runners-up, only two advanced)
 Dynamo Kyiv, 10 points in 1999–2000 (second group stage) and 2004–05
 Borussia Dortmund, 10 points in 2002–03 (second group stage)
 PSV Eindhoven, 10 points in 2003–04
 Olympiacos, 10 points in 2004–05
 Werder Bremen, 10 points in 2006–07
 Manchester City, 10 points in 2011–12
 Chelsea, 10 points in 2012–13
 CFR Cluj, 10 points in 2012–13
 Benfica, 10 points in 2013–14
 Porto, 10 points in 2015–16
 Ajax, 10 points in 2019–20

Most points achieved in the group stage, not winning the group 
 Manchester City, 15 points in 2013–14 (ranked second)
 Bayern Munich, 15 points in 2017–18 (ranked second)
Barcelona, 15 points in 2020–21 (ranked second)
 Liverpool, 15 points in 2022–23 (ranked second)
 Paris Saint-Germain, 14 points in 2022–23 (ranked second)
 Arsenal, 13 points in 2014–15 (ranked second)
 Paris Saint-Germain, 13 points in 2015–16 (ranked second)
 Real Madrid, 13 points in 2017–18 (ranked second)
 Atlético Madrid, 13 points in 2018–19 (ranked second)
 Sevilla, 13 points in 2020–21 (ranked second)
 Porto, 13 points in 2020–21 (ranked second)
 Chelsea, 13 points in 2021–22 (ranked second)

Fewest points achieved, yet advanced 
 Milan, 5 points in 1994–95 (3 wins and 1 draw, 2 points deducted, 2 points for a win)
 Zenit Saint Petersburg, 6 points in 2013–14
 Roma, 6 points in 2015–16
 Legia Warsaw, 7 points in 1995–96
 Dynamo Kyiv, 7 points in 1999–2000
 Liverpool, 7 points in 2001–02 (second group stage)
 Lokomotiv Moscow, 7 points in 2002–03
 Werder Bremen, 7 points in 2005–06
 Rangers, 7 points in 2005–06
 Galatasaray, 7 points in 2013–14
 Basel, 7 points in 2014–15
 Atalanta, 7 points in 2019–20
 Atlético Madrid, 7 points in 2021–22

Fewest points achieved, yet qualified to UEFA Cup/UEFA Europa League 
 Borussia Dortmund, 2 points in 2017–18

Knocked out on tiebreakers 
Several teams have been knocked out on a tiebreaker, most on the head-to-head criteria:
 Manchester United lost on overall goal difference to Barcelona in 1994–95
 Casino Salzburg lost on overall goal difference to Milan in 1994–95, although Milan had been docked 2 points due to crowd trouble (2 points for a win, would have been 2 points behind with 3 points for a win)
 Paris Saint-Germain lost on overall goal difference to Bayern Munich in 1997–98 (second place, only one team advanced directly), and on goal difference to Juventus in the ranking of runners-up
 Galatasaray and Rosenborg lost on head-to-head points to Juventus in 1998–99. Although each team had 8 points, in matches played between the three sides in question, Juventus had 6 points, Galatasaray had 5 points, and Rosenborg had 4 points (only first place team advanced directly)
 Bayer Leverkusen lost on head-to-head points to Dynamo Kyiv in 1999–2000 (first group stage)
 Dynamo Kyiv lost on head-to-head points to Real Madrid in 1999–2000 (second group stage), despite having a better goal difference
 Olympiacos lost on head-to-head away goals to Lyon in 2000–01 (first group stage), on head-to-head goal difference to Liverpool in 2004–05, and on head-to-head goal difference to Arsenal in 2015–16. In 2004–05, Liverpool went on to win the final.
 Rangers lost on head-to-head points to Galatasaray in 2000–01 (first group stage), despite having a better goal difference
 Lyon lost to Arsenal in 2000–01 (second group stage), and to Ajax in 2002–03 (first group stage), both times on head-to-head points despite having a better goal difference
 Borussia Dortmund lost on overall goal difference to Boavista in 2001–02 (first group stage), with both teams winning 2–1 at home in head-to-head matches
 Mallorca lost on head-to-head goal difference to Arsenal in 2001–02
 Roma lost on head-to-head points to Liverpool in 2001–02 (second group stage), despite having a better goal difference
 Inter Milan lost on head-to-head points to Lokomotiv Moscow in 2003–04
 PSV Eindhoven lost on head-to-head goal difference to Deportivo La Coruña in 2003–04, despite having a better overall goal difference
 Udinese lost to Werder Bremen in 2005–06
 Ajax lost on overall goal difference to Lyon in 2011–12, with both head-to-head games ending in a 0–0 draw. Lyon won their last group game against Dinamo Zagreb 7–1 (after being 0–1 down at half time) while Ajax lost 0–3 against Real Madrid. The aggregate goal difference in both games had to be at least a 7-goal swing for Lyon to advance, and Lyon successfully managed to reach 9.
 Chelsea lost on head-to-head away goals to Shakhtar Donetsk in 2012–13, despite having a better goal difference
 CFR Cluj lost on head-to-head points to Galatasaray in 2012–13, despite having a better goal difference
 Benfica lost on head-to-head points to Olympiacos in 2013–14
 Napoli lost on head-to-head goal difference to Borussia Dortmund and Arsenal in 2013–14. Although each team had 12 points and 8 points in matches played between the three sides, the goal difference in games played between the three was +1 for Borussia Dortmund, 0 for Arsenal and −1 for Napoli.
 Bayer Leverkusen lost on head-to-head points to Roma in 2015–16, despite having a better goal difference
 Inter Milan lost on head-to-head away goals to Tottenham Hotspur in 2018–19
 Napoli lost on overall goals scored to Liverpool in 2018–19, with both teams winning 1–0 at home in head-to-head matches. Liverpool defeated Napoli in their final group game, with Paris Saint-Germain defeating Red Star Belgrade in the other match to top the group with 11 points. With both Liverpool and Napoli tied on 9 points, having identical head-to-head results, and a goal difference of +2, Liverpool advanced by virtue of having scored more overall goals than Napoli (9 to Napoli's 7). Liverpool went on to win the final.
 Shakhtar Donetsk lost on head-to-head points to Borussia Mönchengladbach in 2020–21
 Borussia Dortmund lost on head-to-head goal difference to Sporting CP in 2021–22

Knocked out on 3 points for a win rule 
1995–96 was the first tournament in which three points were awarded for a win instead of two. The following teams were knocked out from the group stage, but would have advanced following the old rule:
 Rosenborg was ranked fourth out of six runners-up in 1997–98, but would have equalled the points of Paris Saint-Germain and eventual finalists Juventus and advanced on goal difference
 Bayer Leverkusen ended third in Group A in 1999–2000, but would have been one point ahead of Dynamo Kyiv
 Panathinaikos ended third in Group E in 2004–05, but would have equalled the points of PSV Eindhoven and advanced on head-to-head matches
 Werder Bremen ended third in Group B in 2008–09, but would have equalled the points of Inter Milan and advanced on head-to-head matches
 Napoli ended third in Group C in 2018–19, but would have been one point ahead of eventual winners Liverpool.

Other group stage records 
 Bayern Munich holds the record of winning 19 consecutive opening fixtures starting from a 2–1 win against Celtic in the 2003–04 season until a 2–0 away win against Inter Milan in 2022–23.
 Bayern Munich holds the record of most consecutive undefeated matches in the group stage with 34 games, starting from a 3–0 win against Celtic in the 2017–18 season until a 2–0 win over Inter Milan in 2022–23.
 Bayern Munich holds the record of most consecutive wins in the group stage with 13 games, starting from a 2–0 win against Lokomotiv Moscow in the 2020–21 season until a 2–0 win over Inter Milan in 2022–23.
 Panathinaikos is the only team that has ever played seven matches in the group stage (instead of the usual six). After Panathinaikos lost 1–0 away to Dynamo Kyiv on matchday one of the 1995–96 group stage, the Ukrainian team was expelled from the competition by UEFA following Spanish referee Antonio Jesús López Nieto reporting he received a bribe attempt from the side. To replace Dynamo Kyiv in the group stage, UEFA promoted their qualifying round rivals Aalborg BK, who were allowed to play a replacement fixture against Panathinaikos in between matchdays three and four. Although this took the total number of group matches played by Panathinaikos to seven, their result against Dynamo Kyiv was annulled.

Qualifying from first qualifying round 
Since the addition of a third qualifying round in 1999–2000, eight teams have negotiated all three rounds of qualification and reached the Champions League group phase:
 Liverpool in 2005–06
 Artmedia Bratislava in 2005–06
 Anorthosis in 2008–09
 BATE Borisov in 2008–09
 Red Star Belgrade in 2018–19 and 2019–20
 Ferencváros in 2020–21
 Sheriff Tiraspol in 2021–22
 Malmö FF in 2021–22
 Liverpool went on to become the first team in the history of the competition to reach the knockout phase from the first qualifying round.
 Four teams have progressed to the group stage from the first qualifying round since the competition format was altered for the 2009–10 season (with the addition of a fourth 'play-off' round), which are Red Star Belgrade (2018–19 and 2019–20), Ferencváros (2020–21), Malmö FF, and Sheriff Tiraspol (both in 2021–22).

Winning after playing in a qualifying round 

Four teams have won the tournament from the third qualification round:
 Manchester United in 1998–99
 Milan in 2002–03 and 2006–07
 Liverpool in 2004–05
 Barcelona in 2008–09

Most knockout tie wins 
Real Madrid holds the record for most knockout tie wins in the competition's history, with 112 overall. Their first knockout tie success came following a 7–0 aggregate win over Servette in the 1955–56 first round, and their most recent victory was a 6–2 aggregate win against Liverpool in the 2022–23 round of 16.

Consecutive goalscoring 
Real Madrid and Paris Saint-Germain share the record of consecutive goalscoring in Champions League matches, with both sides scoring at least one goal in 34 successive games. Real Madrid's run started with a 1–1 draw in the second leg of their semi-final tie against Barcelona on 3 May 2011. This run continued into the entirety of the next two seasons, with Madrid scoring in all twelve matches of both their 2011–12 and 2012–13 Champions League campaigns. The club then scored in the first nine games of their 2013–14 campaign (six group stage games, both legs of the round of 16 and the first leg of the quarter-finals), with the run coming to an end following a 2–0 away loss against Borussia Dortmund in the second leg of the quarter-finals on 8 April 2014.

Paris Saint-Germain's run started with a 1–1 group stage draw against Arsenal on 13 September 2016. This streak continued with PSG scoring at least once in all 24 matches played over the course of their 2016–17, 2017–18 and 2018–19 Champions League campaigns (including all six group stage games and both legs of the round of 16). The club then scored in all six group stage games, both legs of the round of 16, and the single-legged quarter-finals and semi-finals of the 2019–20 edition, with their run ending in the final following a 0–1 defeat to Bayern Munich on 23 August 2020.

Consecutive home wins 
Bayern Munich hold the record of 21 consecutive home wins in the European Cup era. The run began with a 2–0 win against Saint-Étienne in the first leg of the 1969–70 first round. The run ended with a 1–1 draw to Liverpool in the second leg of the 1980–81 semi-finals. In the Champions League era, the record stands at 16 games and is also held by Bayern Munich. The run began with a 1–0 win against Manchester City in the first match of the 2014–15 group stage and reached the 16th win after a 5–1 victory over Arsenal in the 2016–17 round of 16, then it ended after a 2–1 loss to Real Madrid in the quarter-finals of that season.

Consecutive away wins 
The most consecutive away wins in the Champions League (not including matches played at neutral venues) is seven, achieved on two occasions. Ajax were the first side to reach this number; their run began with a 2–0 group stage win against Real Madrid at the Santiago Bernabéu on 22 November 1995. They then defeated Borussia Dortmund at the Westfalenstadion in the quarter-finals and Panathinaikos at the Spyridon Louis in the semi-finals. Ajax's run continued the following season, winning all three away group stage matches, against Auxerre, Rangers and Grasshopper. Their record seventh win came on 19 March 1997, after defeating Atlético Madrid 3–2 at the Vicente Calderón after extra time in the quarter-finals. The streak would end in the following round, as Ajax lost 4–1 to Juventus in the semi-finals at the Stadio delle Alpi on 23 April 1997.

Bayern Munich would go on to equal this record nearly two decades later; their run began with a 3–1 round of 16 victory against Arsenal at the Emirates Stadium on 19 February 2013, and continued with wins against Juventus at the Juventus Stadium in the quarter-finals and Barcelona at the Camp Nou in the semi-finals. The streak continued the following season, with group stage away wins over Manchester City, Viktoria Plzeň and CSKA Moscow. The record equaling seventh win was achieved when Bayern again defeated Arsenal at the Emirates Stadium in the round of 16 on 19 February 2014. Their run ended with a 1–1 draw at Old Trafford against Manchester United in the first leg of the quarter-finals on 1 April 2014.

Consecutive wins 
Bayern Munich (2019–20 and 2020–21) holds the record of 15 consecutive wins in the Champions League. Bayern's run started on 18 September 2019 with a 3–0 win against Red Star Belgrade in their first group stage match, after losing 1–3 against Liverpool in the previous season's round of 16. The run continued in their other five group matches and all five knockout matches, as they defeated Paris Saint-Germain 1–0 in the final. Bayern won the next four matches of the following season's group stage, before their streak ended on 1 December 2020 with a 1–1 draw against Atlético Madrid.

Bayern Munich is also the first club to win all of their matches (without needing extra time) in a Champions League season, winning 11 out of 11 in their successful 2019–20 campaign.

Longest home undefeated run 
The record for the longest unbeaten run at home stands at 43 games and is held by Bayern Munich. Bayern Munich's run began with a 2–0 win against Saint-Étienne in the first leg of the 1969–70 first round. The run ended with a 2–1 defeat to Red Star Belgrade in the first leg of the 1990–91 semi-finals. In the Champions League era, the record stands at 38 games and is held by Barcelona. Barcelona's run began with a 4–0 win against Ajax in the first match of the 2013–14 group stage and reached the 38th match in a 2–1 win against Dynamo Kyiv in the 2020–21 group stage, before it ended after a 3–0 loss to Juventus in the final match of the group stage of that season.

Longest away undefeated run 
The record for the longest away unbeaten run stands at 22 games and is held by Bayern Munich. The run began with a 2–1 win against Celtic in the 2017–18 group stage, and reached its 22nd match following Bayern's 1–1 draw away to Red Bull Salzburg in the 2021–22 round of 16. The streak ended in the following round, following Bayern's 1–0 quarter-final defeat at Villarreal. During this run, Bayern defeated Barcelona and Lyon in the 2019–20 quarter-finals and semi-finals respectively, played in Lisbon over a single leg as a result of the COVID-19 pandemic. They also defeated Paris Saint-Germain in the 2020 final. These matches, however, were played at a neutral venue, and as such are not classified as away games.

Longest undefeated run 
The record for the longest unbeaten run stands at 25 games and is held by Manchester United. The streak began with a 1–0 away win against Sporting CP in their opening group stage game in 2007–08 and reached a 25th game following their 3–1 away win against Arsenal in the second leg of the 2008–09 semi-finals. The streak then ended with a 2–0 loss to Barcelona in the 2009 final.

Most consecutive draws 
AEK Athens holds the record for the most consecutive draws: 7 draws starting from 17 September 2002 until 17 September 2003.

Most consecutive defeats 
Jeunesse Esch holds the record for the most consecutive defeats in the competition, with 16 straight losses. The streak began with a 2–0 first round loss against Liverpool on 13 October 1973, and continued up to a 4–1 defeat to AGF Aarhus on 16 September 1987. The streak ended when they beat the same team 1–0 two weeks later. In the Champions League era, the record stands at 13 games and is held by Marseille. Marseille's run began with a 2–1 loss to Inter Milan in the round of 16 on 13 March 2012, and continued up to a 2–0 defeat to Porto on 25 November 2020. The streak ended with Marseille's 2–1 win over Olympiacos on 1 December 2020.

Most consecutive games without a win 
Steaua București holds the record for the most consecutive Champions League games without a win. They failed to record a victory in 23 matches played in the competition from 26 September 2006 until 11 December 2013, although they did win games in the qualifying rounds during that period. They have not appeared in the group stage since the last of those 23 games.

Players

Appearances

All-time top player appearances

Other records 
 On 22 February 2006, Raúl made his 100th Champions League appearance, the first player to do so, all with Real Madrid.
 Iker Casillas featured in 20 consecutive Champions League campaigns from 1999–2000 to 2018–19, playing for Real Madrid and Porto. On 11 December 2018, Casillas, in a 3–2 away win over Galatasaray, became the first player to reach the knockout stage 19 times.
 Xavi holds the record for most appearances for a single club, with 151 for Barcelona.
 Zlatan Ibrahimović is the only player to play in the tournament with seven clubs, doing so with Ajax, Juventus, Inter Milan, Barcelona, Milan, Paris Saint-Germain and Manchester United.

Goalscoring

All-time top scorers 

Notes

Top scorers by seasons 

 Cristiano Ronaldo was the top scorer for a record six consecutive seasons and seven seasons overall: 2007–08, 2012–13, 2013–14, 2014–15, 2015–16, 2016–17 and 2017–18.
 Erling Haaland became the youngest top scorer in a Champions League or European Cup season in 2020–21, aged , with ten goals for Borussia Dortmund.
 Ferenc Puskás became the oldest top scorer in a Champions League or European Cup season in 1963–64, aged , with seven goals for Real Madrid.
 Real Madrid has produced the top scorer on a record sixteen occasions:
 Alfredo Di Stéfano in 1957–58 and 1961–62
 Ferenc Puskás in 1959–60, 1961–62 and 1963–64
 Justo Tejada in 1961–62
 Míchel in 1987–88
 Raúl in 1999–2000 and 2000–01
 Cristiano Ronaldo in 2012–13, 2013–14, 2014–15, 2015–16, 2016–17 and 2017–18
 Karim Benzema in 2021–22
 Portuguese players have been the season's top scorer on a record thirteen occasions:
 José Águas in 1960–61
 José Torres in 1964–65
 Eusébio in 1964–65, 1965–66, and 1967–68
 Rui Águas in 1987–88
 Cristiano Ronaldo in 2007–08, 2012–13, 2013–14, 2014–15, 2015–16, 2016–17 and 2017–18
 José (1960–61) and Rui Águas (1987–88) are the only father–son duo to finish as top scorers; each achieved this while playing for Benfica.
 Jupp Heynckes is the only player to have been top scorer in this competition as well as in the Cup Winners' Cup and the UEFA Cup/Europa League:
 1975–76 top scorer with Borussia Mönchengladbach, and 1972–73 UEFA Cup, 1973–74 Cup Winners' Cup, and 1974–75 UEFA Cup top scorer also with Borussia Mönchengladbach
 The following top scorers have also been top scorers in the UEFA Cup/Europa League:
 Allan Simonsen (1977–78 with Borussia Mönchengladbach) in the 1978–79 season with Borussia Mönchengladbach
 Dieter Hoeneß (1981–82 with Bayern Munich) in the 1979–80 season with Bayern Munich
 Torbjörn Nilsson (1984–85 and 1985–86 with Göteborg) in the 1981–82 season with Göteborg
 Gerd Müller is the only player to have been top scorer in this competition as well as in the World Cup and the European Championship:
 1972–73, 1973–74, 1974–75, and 1976–77 top scorer with Bayern Munich, 1970 FIFA World Cup and UEFA Euro 1972 top scorer with West Germany
 The following top scorers have also won the FIFA World Cup Golden Boot:
 Just Fontaine (1958–59) at the 1958 FIFA World Cup
 Flórián Albert (1965–66) at the 1962 FIFA World Cup
 Eusébio (1964–65, 1965–66, and 1967–68) at the 1966 FIFA World Cup
 Paolo Rossi (1982–83) at the 1982 FIFA World Cup
 The following top scorers have also been top scorers in the UEFA European Championship:
 Michel Platini (1984–85) at the UEFA Euro 1984
 Marco van Basten (1988–89) at the UEFA Euro 1988
 Cristiano Ronaldo (2007–08, 2012–13, 2013–14, 2014–15, 2015–16, 2016–17 and 2017–18) at the UEFA Euro 2012 and the UEFA Euro 2020

Most goals in a single season

Hat-tricks 

 The European Cup's first hat-trick was scored by Péter Palotás of MTK Hungária against Anderlecht on 7 September 1955, in the second match ever played in the competition.
 The first hat-trick of the Champions League era was scored by PSV Eindhoven's Juul Ellerman against Žalgiris on 16 September 1992.
 Only three players managed to score a hat-trick in a final:
 Alfredo Di Stéfano for Real Madrid against Eintracht Frankfurt in 1960
 Ferenc Puskás for Real Madrid against Eintracht Frankfurt in 1960 (four goals) and for Real Madrid against Benfica in 1962 – Puskás in 1962 is the only player to score a hat-trick in a final and lose
 Pierino Prati for Milan against Ajax in 1969
 Only Cristiano Ronaldo has scored three hat-tricks in a single Champions League season (3+4+3 goals), doing so in 2015–16.
 Six players have scored two hat-tricks in a single Champions League season:
 Lionel Messi (3+5 goals and 3+3 goals) in 2011–12 and 2016–17
 Mario Gómez (3+4 goals) in 2011–12
 Luiz Adriano, who scored hat-tricks in two consecutive games of the group stage (5+3 goals) in 2014–15
 Cristiano Ronaldo, who scored hat-tricks in two consecutive games of the knockout stage (3+3 goals) in 2016–17
 Robert Lewandowski (3+3 goals) in 2021–22
 Karim Benzema (3+3 goals) in 2021–22, who, like Ronaldo, scored hat-tricks in two consecutive knockout stage matches
 Only Robert Lewandowski has scored hat-tricks with three teams (Borussia Dortmund, Bayern Munich and Barcelona).
 The fastest-ever Champions League hat-trick was scored by Liverpool's Mohamed Salah, who managed to accomplish this feat in six minutes and twelve seconds against Rangers on 12 October 2022. In addition, this is the fastest-ever Champions League hat-trick was scored by a substitute.
 The fastest-ever Champions League hat-trick from the start of a match was scored by Robert Lewandowski, who scored three goals in the opening 23 minutes of Bayern Munich's match against Red Bull Salzburg on 8 March 2022.
 Raúl is the youngest scorer of a Champions League hat-trick, scoring three goals for Real Madrid against Ferencváros on 18 October 1995, aged 18 years and 114 days.
 Wayne Rooney is the youngest debut scorer of a Champions League hat-trick, scoring three goals for Manchester United against Fenerbahçe on 28 September 2004, aged 18 years and 340 days.
 Ferenc Puskás is the oldest scorer of a hat-trick in the tournament, scoring four goals for Real Madrid against Feyenoord on 22 September 1965, aged 38 years and 173 days.
 Karim Benzema is the oldest scorer of a hat-trick in the Champions League era, scoring three goals for Real Madrid against Chelsea on 6 April 2022, aged 34 years and 108 days.
 Ten players have scored a hat-trick on their debut in the Champions League era:
 Marco van Basten for Milan against IFK Göteborg (25 November 1992) – together with Sébastien Haller, (Ajax) against Sporting CP (15 September 2021) the only player who scored 4 goals in their debut
 Faustino Asprilla for Newcastle United against Barcelona (17 September 1997)
 Yakubu for Maccabi Haifa against Olympiacos (24 September 2002)
 Wayne Rooney for Manchester United against Fenerbahçe (28 September 2004)
 Vincenzo Iaquinta for Udinese against Panathinaikos (14 September 2005)
 Grafite for VfL Wolfsburg against CSKA Moscow (15 September 2009)
 Yacine Brahimi for Porto against BATE Borisov (17 September 2014)
 Erling Haaland for Red Bull Salzburg against Genk (17 September 2019)
 Mislav Oršić for Dinamo Zagreb against Atalanta (18 September 2019)
 Sébastien Haller for Ajax against Sporting CP (15 September 2021)
 Lionel Messi and Cristiano Ronaldo have both scored a record eight hat-tricks in the Champions League.

Four goals in a match 

The following players have scored four goals in one European Cup/UEFA Champions League match. Only Alfredo Di Stéfano, Ferenc Puskás, Sándor Kocsis, Lionel Messi and Robert Lewandowski managed to do this from the quarter-final stage onwards and Ferenc Puskás is the only footballer to score four goals in a final (1960).

 European Cup era:
 Miloš Milutinović (Partizan), 5–2 against Sporting CP, 1955–56 first round
 Dennis Viollet (Manchester United), 10–0 against Anderlecht, 1956–57 preliminary round
 Jovan Cokić (Red Star Belgrade), 9–1 against Stade Dudelange, 1957–58 preliminary round
 Bora Kostić (Red Star Belgrade), 9–1 against Stade Dudelange, 1957–58 preliminary round
 Alfredo Di Stéfano (Real Madrid), 8–0 against Sevilla, 1957–58 quarter-final, and 7–1 against Wiener Sport-Club, 1958–59 quarter-final
 Just Fontaine (Reims), 4–1 away against Ards, 1958–59 first round
 Josef Hamerl (Wiener Sport-Club), 7–0 against Juventus, 1958–59 first round
 Sándor Kocsis (Barcelona), 5–2 away against Wolverhampton Wanderers, 1959–60 quarter-final
 Ferenc Puskás (Real Madrid), 7–3 against Eintracht Frankfurt, 1959–60 final, and 5–0 against Feyenoord, 1965–66 preliminary round
 Lucien Cossou (Monaco), 7–2 against AEK Athens, 1963–64 preliminary round
 Vladimir Kovačević (Partizan), 6–2 against Jeunesse Esch, 1963–64 first round
 José Torres (Benfica), 5–1 away against Aris, 1964–65 preliminary round
 Eusébio (Benfica), 10–0 against Stade Dudelange, 1965–66 preliminary round
 Friedhelm Konietzka (1860 Munich), 8–0 against Omonia, 1966–67 first round
 Denis Law (Manchester United), 7–1 against Waterford United, 1968–69 first round
 Zoran Antonijević (Red Star Belgrade), 4–2 away against Linfield, 1969–70 first round
 Ruud Geels (Feyenoord), 12–2 away against KR Reykjavík, 1969–70 first round
 Antonis Antoniadis (Panathinaikos), 5–0 against Jeunesse Esch, 1970–71 first round
 João Lourenço (Sporting CP), 5–0 against Floriana, 1970–71 first round
 Kurt Müller (Grasshoppers), 8–0 against Reipas Lahti, 1971–72 first round
 Dudu Georgescu (Dinamo București), 11–0 against Crusaders, 1973–74 first round
 Radu Nunweiller (Dinamo București), 11–0 against Crusaders, 1973–74 first round
 Jupp Heynckes (Borussia Mönchengladbach), 6–1 away against Wacker Innsbruck, 1975–76 first round
 René van de Kerkhof (PSV Eindhoven), 6–0 against Dundalk, 1976–77 first round
 Willy van der Kuijlen (PSV Eindhoven), 6–1 against Fenerbahçe, 1978–79 first round
 Sotiris Kaiafas (Omonia), 6–1 against Red Boys Differdange, 1979–80 first round
 Ton Blanker (Ajax), 8–1 against HJK Helsinki, 1979–80 first round
 Fernando Gomes (Porto), 9–0 against Rabat Ajax, 1986–87 first round
 Marco van Basten (Milan), 5–2 against Vitosha, 1988–89 first round
 Rabah Madjer (Porto), 8–1 away against Portadown, 1990–91 first round
 Hugo Sánchez (Real Madrid), 9–1 against Swarovski Tirol, 1990–91 second round
 Alan Smith (Arsenal), 6–1 against Austria Wien, 1991–92 first round
 Sergei Yuran (Benfica), 6–0 away against Ħamrun Spartans, 1991–92 first round
 Champions League era, preliminary rounds:
 Serhii Rebrov (Dynamo Kyiv), 8–0 against Barry Town, 1998–99 first qualifying round
 Pena (Porto), 8–0 against Barry Town United, 2001–02 second qualifying round
 Tomasz Frankowski (Wisła Kraków), 8–2 away against WIT Georgia, 2004–05 second qualifying round
 Semih Şentürk (Fenerbahçe), 5–0 away against MTK Hungária, 2008–09 second qualifying round
 Champions League era:
 Marco van Basten (Milan), 4–0 against IFK Göteborg, 1992–93 group stage
 Simone Inzaghi (Lazio), 5–1 against Marseille, 1999–2000 second group stage
 Dado Pršo (Monaco), 8–3 against Deportivo La Coruña, 2003–04 group stage
 Ruud van Nistelrooy (Manchester United), 4–1 against Sparta Prague, 2004–05 group stage
 Andriy Shevchenko (Milan), 4–0 away against Fenerbahçe, 2005–06 group stage
 Lionel Messi (Barcelona), 4–1 against Arsenal, 2009–10 quarter-final
 Bafétimbi Gomis (Lyon), 7–1 against Dinamo Zagreb, 2011–12 group stage
 Mario Gómez (Bayern Munich), 7–0 against Basel, 2011–12 round of 16
 Robert Lewandowski (Borussia Dortmund), 4–1 against Real Madrid, 2012–13 semi-final
 Zlatan Ibrahimović (Paris Saint-Germain), 5–0 against Anderlecht, 2013–14 group stage
 Cristiano Ronaldo (Real Madrid), 8–0 against Malmö FF, 2015–16 group stage
 Serge Gnabry (Bayern Munich), 7–2 against Tottenham Hotspur, 2019–20 group stage
 Robert Lewandowski (Bayern Munich), 6–0 against Red Star Belgrade, 2019–20 group stage
Josip Iličić (Atalanta), 4–3 against Valencia, 2019–20 round of 16
 Olivier Giroud (Chelsea), 4–0 against Sevilla, 2020–21 group stage
 Sébastien Haller (Ajax), 5–1 against Sporting CP, 2021–22 group stage

Five goals in a match 

The following players have managed to score five goals in one European Cup/UEFA Champions League match:
 European Cup era:
 Ove Olsson (Gothenburg), 6–1 against Linfield, 1959–60 preliminary round
 Bent Løfqvist (Boldklubben 1913), 9–2 against Spora, 1961–62 preliminary round
 José Altafini (Milan), 8–0 against Union Luxembourg, 1962–63 preliminary round
 Ray Crawford (Ipswich), 10–0 against Floriana, 1962–63 preliminary round
 Nikola Kotkov (Lokomotiv Sofia), 8–3 against Malmö FF, 1964–65 preliminary round
 Flórián Albert (Ferencváros), 9–1 against Keflavík, 1965–66 preliminary round
 Paul van Himst (Anderlecht), 10–1 away against Haka, 1966–67 first round
 Gerd Müller (Bayern Munich), 9–0 against Omonia, 1972–73 second round
 Claudio Sulser (Grasshoppers), 8–0 against Valletta, 1978–79 first round
 Søren Lerby (Ajax), 10–0 against Omonia, 1979–80 second round
 Champions League era, preliminary rounds:
 Mihails Miholaps (Skonto), 8–0 against Jeunesse Esch, 1999–2000 first qualifying round
 David Lafata (Sparta Prague), 7–0 against Levadia Tallinn, 2014–15 second qualifying round
 Champions League era:
 Lionel Messi (Barcelona), 7–1 against Bayer Leverkusen, 2011–12 round of 16
 Luiz Adriano (Shakhtar Donetsk), 7–0 against BATE Borisov, 2014–15 group stage
 Erling Haaland (Manchester City), 7–0 against RB Leipzig, 2022–23 round of 16

Oldest and youngest 
 Manfred Burgsmüller of Werder Bremen became the oldest player (aged 38 years, 293 days) to score in the European Cup and Champions League proper, when he scored against Dynamo Berlin on 11 October 1988. Including qualifying stages, Lee Casciaro of Lincoln Red Imps became the oldest player (aged 40 years, 286 days) to score in European Cup and Champions League, when he scored against KF Shkupi in a first qualifying round on 12 July 2022.
 Włodzimierz Lubański of Górnik Zabrze became the youngest player (aged 16 years, 258 days) to score in the European Cup and Champions League, when he scored against Dukla Prague on 13 November 1963.
 Francesco Totti of Roma became the oldest player (aged 38 years, 59 days) to score in the Champions League proper, when he scored against CSKA Moscow on 25 November 2014.
Ansu Fati of Barcelona became the youngest player (aged 17 years, 40 days) to score in the Champions League, when he scored against Inter Milan on 10 December 2019.
 Bojan Krkić of Barcelona became the youngest player (aged 17 years, 217 days) to score in the Champions League knockout stage, when he scored against Schalke on 1 April 2008.
 Antonio Nusa of Club Brugge became the youngest player (aged 17 years, 189 days) to score on his Champions League debut, when he scored against Porto on 13 September 2022.
 Rico Lewis of Manchester City became the youngest player (aged 17 years, 346 days) to score on his first Champions League start, when he scored against Sevilla on 2 November 2022.
 Paolo Maldini of Milan became the oldest player (aged 36 years, 333 days) to score in the European Cup and Champions League final, when he scored against Liverpool in the 2005 final.
 Patrick Kluivert of Ajax became the youngest player (aged 18 years, 327 days) to score in the European Cup and Champions League final, when he scored against Milan in the 1995 final.

Fastest goals 

 The fastest Champions League goal was scored by Roy Makaay, who got a goal after 10.12 seconds for Bayern Munich against Real Madrid on 7 March 2007.
 The fastest Champions League group stage goal was scored by Jonas, who got a goal after 10.96 seconds for Valencia against Bayer Leverkusen on 1 November 2011.
 The fastest goal in the second half was scored by Federico Chiesa, who got a goal after 10 seconds of the second half for Juventus against Chelsea on 29 September 2021.
 The fastest goal in a Champions League final was scored by Paolo Maldini, who got a goal after 53 seconds in the 2005 final for Milan against Liverpool.
 The fastest Champions League goal by a substitute was scored by Vinícius Júnior, who got a goal 14 seconds after coming on for Real Madrid against Shakhtar Donetsk on 21 October 2020.
 The fastest Champions League goal by a debutant was scored by Yevhen Konoplyanka, who got a goal 19 seconds after coming on for Sevilla against Borussia Mönchengladbach on 15 September 2015, while the fastest Champions League goal by a debutant from the start of the match was scored by Dušan Vlahović, who got a goal 33 seconds into the match for Juventus against Villarreal on 22 February 2022.

First goal 
 On 4 September 1955, João Baptista Martins scored the first goal of the European Cup with Sporting CP after 14 minutes in a 3–3 draw against Partizan.
 On 25 November 1992, Daniel Amokachi scored the first goal of the UEFA Champions League with Club Brugge against CSKA Moscow.

Other goalscoring records 
 Cristiano Ronaldo has scored a record 140 goals in the competition (73 , 25 , 25 , 13 , 4 ) (95 , 20 , 25 ).
 Erling Haaland holds the record for the highest-ever goals-per-game ratio for players who have played at least 20 matches (1.32); he scored 33 goals in 25 matches.
 Ferenc Puskás and Alfredo Di Stéfano have each scored seven goals in the finals. Puskás scored four in 1960 and three in 1962, while Di Stéfano scored seven goals in an aforementioned five finals.
 Cristiano Ronaldo holds the record for most goals in the finals in the UEFA Champions league era, with 4. He scored one goal each in 2008 and 2014, and two in 2017.
 Cristiano Ronaldo holds the record for most goals in the knockout phase, with 67.
 Cristiano Ronaldo holds the record for most goals in the semi-finals, with 13.
 Cristiano Ronaldo holds the record for most goals in the quarter-finals, with 25.
 Lionel Messi holds the record for most goals in the round of 16, with 29.
 Lionel Messi holds the record for most goals in the group stage, with 80.
 Ferenc Puskás holds the record in a single season's knockout phase in the competition (from round of 16 onwards), scoring twelve in the 1959–60 campaign.
 Two players scored a record ten goals in a single season's knockout phase in the Champions League era (from round of 16 onwards):
 Cristiano Ronaldo with Real Madrid in 2016–17.
 Karim Benzema with Real Madrid in 2021–22.
 Cristiano Ronaldo became the first player to score 100 goals in the competition on 18 April 2017. On 18 February 2018, he became the first player to score 100 goals with a single club (Real Madrid).
 Two players have scored in all six group stage matches of the competition:
 Cristiano Ronaldo scored nine goals for Real Madrid in 2017–18.
Sébastien Haller scored ten goals for Ajax in 2021–22.
 Cristiano Ronaldo holds the record for most group stage goals in a single season of the UEFA Champions League, scoring eleven in the 2015–16 campaign.
 Cristiano Ronaldo scored at least ten goals in a record seven consecutive seasons in the competition (2011–12 to 2017–18).
 Cristiano Ronaldo scored in a record eleven consecutive UEFA Champions League appearances; he scored in the 2017 final and the first ten matches (six group games and both legs of the round of 16 and quarter-finals) of the 2017–18 season (a total of seventeen goals).
 Cristiano Ronaldo scored in a record twelve consecutive away UEFA Champions League appearances; his streak started from the second leg of the 2012–13 round of 16, and lasted until the first leg of the 2014–15 round of 16 (a total of seventeen goals).
 Three players share the record for most consecutive home UEFA Champions League appearances scored in, with seven:
 Cristiano Ronaldo scored in the second leg of the 2016–17 quarter-finals, the first leg of the semi-finals and the first five home matches of the 2017–18 season (a total of thirteen goals).	
 Robert Lewandowski scored in the second leg of the 2014–15 round of 16, the second leg of the quarter-finals, the second leg of the semi-finals and the first four home matches of the 2015–16 season (a total of ten goals).	
 Thierry Henry scored in a home match of the 2000–01 second group stage, the first leg of the quarter-finals and the first five home matches of the 2001–02 season (a total of nine goals).
 Sébastien Haller scored in a record seven consecutive matches since his competition debut, in 2021–22 for Ajax.
 Three other players scored in their first five matches in the competition:
 Alessandro del Piero scored in five consecutive group stage matches in 1995–96 for Juventus.
 Diego Costa scored in five consecutive matches in 2013–14 for Atlético Madrid.
 Erling Haaland scored in five consecutive group stage matches in 2019–20 for Red Bull Salzburg.
 Lionel Messi holds the record for most home goals, with 78.
 Cristiano Ronaldo holds the record for most away goals, with 63.
 Cristiano Ronaldo has scored a brace or more in a record 38 matches.
 Cristiano Ronaldo has scored a record of twelve direct free kicks (two for Manchester United and ten for Real Madrid).
 Lionel Messi has scored against a record 40 individual Champions League opponents.
 Lionel Messi holds the record for most goals scored for a single club, with 120 for Barcelona.
 Alfredo Di Stéfano has scored in a record five finals, with one goal in each final from 1956 to 1959, and three goals in 1960.
 Cristiano Ronaldo has scored the most goals in finals in the UEFA Champions league era, with four goals in six finals: one goal each in 2008 and 2014, and two in 2017.
 Three players scored for two clubs in the final:
 Velibor Vasović for Partizan in 1966 and for Ajax in 1969.
 Cristiano Ronaldo for Manchester United in 2008 and for Real Madrid in 2014 and 2017 – he is the only player to score for two winning clubs.
 Mario Mandžukić for Bayern Munich in 2013 and for Juventus in 2017.
 Three goalkeepers have scored in the UEFA Champions League:
 Hans-Jörg Butt has done so three times with three clubs, all with penalties, and all against Juventus:
 For Hamburger SV in a 4–4 group stage home draw on 13 September 2000
 For Bayer Leverkusen in a 3–1 second group stage home win on 12 March 2002
 The equaliser for Bayern Munich in a 4–1 group stage win in Turin on 8 December 2009, which Bayern had to win to qualify for the next stage.
 Sinan Bolat is the only goalkeeper to score a goal in open play: his second-half stoppage time (fifth minute) equaliser for Standard Liège against AZ on 9 December 2009 secured third place in Group H, and qualified his team for the Europa League.
 Vincent Enyeama scored a penalty for Hapoel Tel Aviv against Lyon on 29 September 2010.
 Zlatan Ibrahimović is the only player to have scored for six clubs in the Champions League:
 Ajax (6 goals in 19 matches; 2002–03 to 2003–04)
 Juventus (3 goals in 19 matches; 2004–05 to 2005–06)
 Inter Milan (6 goals in 22 matches; 2006–07 to 2008–09)
 Barcelona (4 goals in 10 matches; 2009–10)
 Milan (9 goals in 20 matches; 2010–11 to 2011–12 and 2021–22)
 Paris Saint-Germain (20 goals in 33 matches; 2012–13 to 2015–16)
 Two players has scored in a record eighteen Champions League seasons, with all of them coming consecutively:
 Lionel Messi (from 2005–06 to 2022–23, for Barcelona and Paris Saint-Germain)
 Karim Benzema (from 2005–06 to 2022–23, for Lyon and Real Madrid)
 Cristiano Ronaldo has the most goals against a single opponent, scoring ten times against Juventus (three goals in 2013, two goals in 2015, two goals in 2017 and three goals in 2018).
 Four players have scored against the same opponent with three clubs:
 Ruud van Nistelrooy against Bayern Munich, with PSV Eindhoven, Manchester United and Real Madrid.
 Hans-Jörg Butt against Juventus, with Hamburger SV, Bayer Leverkusen and Bayern Munich.
 Cristiano Ronaldo against Lyon, with Manchester United, Real Madrid and Juventus.
 Edin Džeko against Viktoria Plzeň, with Manchester City, Roma and Inter Milan.
 Only on one occasion have three players from the same team scored at least ten goals in the same season:
 Roberto Firmino, Sadio Mané and Mohamed Salah each scored ten goals for Liverpool in 2017–18.
 Two players from the same team have scored at least ten goals in the same season on one further occasion:
 Lionel Messi and Neymar both scored ten goals for Barcelona in 2014–15.
 Allan Simonsen is the only player to have scored in the final of the European Cup/Champions League, the Cup Winners' Cup and the UEFA Cup/Europa League, with goals in the 1977 European Cup Final and the second leg of both the 1975 and 1979 UEFA Cup Finals with Borussia Mönchengladbach, and in the 1982 Cup Winners' Cup Final with Barcelona.
 The following players have additionally scored in the final of both the European Cup/Champions League and the Cup Winners' Cup:
 Franz Roth scored in both the 1975 and 1976 European Cup Final, and in the 1967 European Cup Winners' Cup Final, all with Bayern Munich.
 Felix Magath scored in the 1983 European Cup Final and in the 1977 European Cup Winners' Cup Final, both with Hamburger SV.
 Marco van Basten scored in the 1989 European Cup Final with Milan and in the 1987 European Cup Winners' Cup Final with Ajax.
 Ronald Koeman scored in the 1992 Final and in the 1991 European Cup Winners' Cup Final, both with Barcelona.
 The following players have additionally scored in the final of both the European Cup/Champions League and the UEFA Cup/Europa League:
 Hernán Crespo scored in the 2005 UEFA Champions League Final with Milan and in the 1999 UEFA Cup Final with Parma.
 Steven Gerrard scored in the 2005 UEFA Champions League Final and in the 2001 UEFA Cup Final, both with Liverpool.
 Pedro scored in the 2011 UEFA Champions League Final with Barcelona and in the 2019 UEFA Europa League Final with Chelsea.
 Diego Godín scored in the 2014 UEFA Champions League Final with Atlético Madrid and in the 2020 UEFA Europa League Final with Inter Milan.
 Gerd Müller is the only player to have scored in the final of the European Cup/Champions League, the FIFA World Cup and the UEFA European Championship, with goals in both the 1974 (replay) and 1975 European Cup Final with Bayern Munich, and in the 1974 FIFA World Cup Final and UEFA Euro 1972 Final with West Germany.
 The following players have additionally scored in the final of both the European Cup/Champions League and the FIFA World Cup:
 Juan Alberto Schiaffino scored in the 1958 European Cup Final with Milan and in the 1950 FIFA World Cup Final with Uruguay.
 Ferenc Puskás scored in both the 1960 and 1962 European Cup Final with Real Madrid and in the 1954 FIFA World Cup Final with Hungary.
 Zoltán Czibor scored in the 1961 European Cup Final with Barcelona and in the 1954 FIFA World Cup Final with Hungary.
 Zinedine Zidane scored in the 2002 Final with Real Madrid and in both the 1998 and 2006 FIFA World Cup Final with France.
 Mario Mandžukić scored in the 2013 UEFA Champions League Final with Bayern Munich, the 2017 UEFA Champions League Final with Juventus, and in the 2018 FIFA World Cup Final with Croatia.
 Lionel Messi scored in the 2009 and 2011 UEFA Champions League Final with Barcelona, and in the 2022 FIFA World Cup Final with Argentina.
 The following players have additionally scored in the final of both the European Cup/Champions League and the UEFA European Championship:
 Michel Platini scored in the 1985 European Cup Final with Juventus and in the UEFA Euro 1984 Final with France.
 Both Ruud Gullit and Marco van Basten scored in the 1989 European Cup Final with Milan and in the UEFA Euro 1988 Final with Netherlands.

Assists

Most assists 

This table does not include assists provided in the qualification stage of the competition. Due to the scarcity of sources, the following table includes the number of assists since the 2003–04 season.

Single season

Other records 
 Four players provided four assists in one match (since 2003–04):
 Ryan Giggs for Manchester United against Roma on 10 April 2007.
 Carlos Martins for Benfica against Lyon on 2 November 2010.
 Zlatan Ibrahimović for Paris Saint-Germain against Dinamo Zagreb on 6 November 2012.
 Neymar for Barcelona against Celtic on 13 September 2016, he scored a goal as well.
 Four players have provided three assists in final matches:
 Raymond Kopa for Real Madrid: 1957 and 1958 (2)
 Roberto Carlos for Real Madrid: 1998 and 2002 (2)
 Andrés Iniesta for Barcelona: 2009, 2011 and 2015
 Marcelo for Real Madrid: 2017 and 2018 (2)
 Four players finished twice at the top of the assists list (including joint top):
 Luís Figo for Barcelona in 1999–2000 and Real Madrid in 2000–01 season.
 Kaká for Milan in 2004–05 and Real Madrid in 2011–12 season.
 Lionel Messi for Barcelona in 2011–12 and 2014–15 season.
 Neymar for Barcelona in 2015–16 and 2016–17 season.

Other records

Most wins 

 Francisco Gento is the only player to win the tournament on six occasions, with victories in 1955–56, 1956–57, 1957–58, 1958–59, 1959–60 and 1965–66, all during his time at Real Madrid.
 Eighteen other players have won the tournament on five occasions:
 Juan Alonso, Alfredo Di Stéfano, Rafael Lesmes, Marquitos, Héctor Rial and José María Zárraga in consecutive seasons (1955–56, 1956–57, 1957–58, 1958–59 and 1959–60), all with Real Madrid
 Alessandro Costacurta and Paolo Maldini (1988–89, 1989–90, 1993–94, 2002–03 and 2006–07), all with Milan
 Cristiano Ronaldo with Manchester United (2007–08) and Real Madrid (2013–14, 2015–16, 2016–17 and 2017–18)
 Toni Kroos with Bayern Munich (2012–13) and Real Madrid (2015–16, 2016–17, 2017–18 and 2021–22)
 Gareth Bale, Karim Benzema, Dani Carvajal, Casemiro, Isco, Marcelo, Nacho and Luka Modrić (2013–14, 2015–16, 2016–17, 2017–18 and 2021–22), all with Real Madrid
 Cristiano Ronaldo has won 113 matches in his Champions League career, the most by any player. The only other player to win more than 100 matches is Iker Casillas (101).
 Robert Lewandowski holds the record for most consecutive matches won by a player in the Champions League, with 22 straight victories whilst with Bayern Munich. The run began on 18 September 2019 with a 3–0 success against Red Star Belgrade in his first group stage match of the 2019–20 season, after losing 3–1 against Liverpool in the previous season's round of 16. The streak continued as Lewandowski started in all of Bayern's other four group victories (he did not play in their win against Tottenham Hotspur) and all five knockout phase wins, as they defeated Paris Saint-Germain 1–0 in the final. In the following season, Lewandowski started in a further four victories for Bayern in the group stage (he did not play against Atlético Madrid or Lokomotiv Moscow) and reached a sixteenth win after appearing in a 2–1 second leg success against Lazio in the round of 16. Because of injury, he did not play against Paris Saint-Germain in either leg of the quarter-finals. In the following season, Lewandowski started in a further six victories for Bayern in the group stage. Lewandowski's streak ended on 16 February 2022, following a 1–1 draw against Red Bull Salzburg in the first leg of the round of 16. 
 Two players have appeared in eight finals:
 Francisco Gento in 1956, 1957, 1958, 1959, 1960, 1962, 1964 and 1966, all with Real Madrid
 Paolo Maldini in 1989, 1990, 1993, 1994, 1995, 2003, 2005 and 2007, all with Milan
 Only one player has won the tournament with three clubs:
 Clarence Seedorf with Ajax in 1994–95, with Real Madrid in 1997–98 and with Milan in 2002–03 and 2006–07
 A further 28 players have won the tournament with two clubs:
 Saul Malatrasi with Inter Milan in 1964–65 and with Milan in 1968–69
 Jimmy Rimmer with Manchester United in 1967–68 and with Aston Villa in 1981–82
 Miodrag Belodedici with Steaua București in 1985–86 and with Red Star Belgrade in 1990–91
 Ronald Koeman with PSV Eindhoven in 1987–88 and with Barcelona in 1991–92
 Frank Rijkaard with Milan in 1988–89 and 1989–90 and with Ajax in 1994–95
 Dejan Savićević with Red Star Belgrade in 1990–91 and with Milan in 1993–94
 Vladimir Jugović with Red Star Belgrade in 1990–91 and with Juventus in 1995–96
 Marcel Desailly with Marseille in 1992–93 and with Milan in 1993–94
 Didier Deschamps with Marseille in 1992–93 and with Juventus in 1995–96
 Christian Panucci with Milan in 1993–94 and with Real Madrid in 1997–98
 Edwin van der Sar with Ajax in 1994–95 and with Manchester United in 2007–08
 Paulo Sousa with Juventus in 1995–96 and with Borussia Dortmund in 1996–97
 Fernando Redondo with Real Madrid in 1997–98 and 1999–2000 and with Milan in 2002–03
 Owen Hargreaves with Bayern Munich in 2000–01 and with Manchester United in 2007–08
 Deco with Porto in 2003–04 and with Barcelona in 2005–06
 José Bosingwa with Porto in 2003–04 and with Chelsea in 2011–12
 Paulo Ferreira with Porto in 2003–04 and with Chelsea in 2011–12
 Xabi Alonso with Liverpool in 2004–05 and with Real Madrid in 2013–14
 Samuel Eto'o with Barcelona in 2005–06 and 2008–09 and with Inter Milan in 2009–10
 Thiago Motta with Barcelona in 2005–06 and with Inter Milan in 2009–10
 Gerard Piqué with Manchester United in 2007–08 and with Barcelona in 2008–09, 2010–11 and 2014–15
 Cristiano Ronaldo with Manchester United in 2007–08 and with Real Madrid in 2013–14, 2015–16, 2016–17 and 2017–18
 Thiago with Barcelona in 2010–11 and with Bayern Munich in 2019–20
 Daniel Sturridge with Chelsea in 2011–12 and with Liverpool in 2018–19
 Toni Kroos with Bayern Munich in 2012–13 and with Real Madrid in 2015–16, 2016–17, 2017–18 and 2021–22
 Xherdan Shaqiri with Bayern Munich in 2012–13 and with Liverpool in 2018–19
 Mateo Kovačić with Real Madrid in 2015–16, 2016–17 and 2017–18 and with Chelsea in 2020–21
 David Alaba with Bayern Munich in 2012–13 and 2019–20 and with Real Madrid in 2021–22
 Four players have won the Champions League in two consecutive seasons with two clubs:
 Marcel Desailly in 1992–93 with Marseille and in 1993–94 with Milan
 Paulo Sousa in 1995–96 with Juventus and in 1996–97 with Borussia Dortmund
 Gerard Piqué in 2007–08 with Manchester United and in 2008–09 with Barcelona
 Samuel Eto'o in 2008–09 with Barcelona and in 2009–10 with Inter Milan – the only player to have won a treble in two consecutive seasons with two clubs
 Eleven players have won both the UEFA Champions League and the FIFA World Cup in the same year:
 1974: Sepp Maier, Paul Breitner, Hans-Georg Schwarzenbeck, Franz Beckenbauer, Gerd Müller, Uli Hoeneß and Jupp Kapellmann (Bayern Munich and West Germany)
 1998: Christian Karembeu (Real Madrid and France)
 2002: Roberto Carlos (Real Madrid and Brazil)
 2014: Sami Khedira (Real Madrid and Germany)
 2018: Raphaël Varane (Real Madrid and France)
 Fourteen players have won both the UEFA Champions League and the UEFA European Championship in the same year:
 1964: Luis Suárez (Inter Milan and Spain)
 1988: Hans van Breukelen, Ronald Koeman, Berry van Aerle, Gerald Vanenburg and Wim Kieft (PSV Eindhoven and Netherlands)
 2000: Christian Karembeu and Nicolas Anelka (Real Madrid and France)
 2012: Fernando Torres and Juan Mata (Chelsea and Spain)
 2016: Cristiano Ronaldo and Pepe (Real Madrid and Portugal)
 2021: Jorginho and Emerson (Chelsea and Italy)
 Nineteen players have been runner-up of the UEFA Champions League and either the FIFA World Cup or UEFA European Championship in the same year:
 1958: Nils Liedholm (Milan and Sweden)
 1982: Karl-Heinz Rummenigge and Paul Breitner (Bayern Munich and West Germany)
 2002: Michael Ballack, Carsten Ramelow, Bernd Schneider, Oliver Neuville and Hans-Jörg Butt (Bayer Leverkusen and Germany)
 2006: Thierry Henry (Arsenal and France)
 2008: Michael Ballack (2) (Chelsea and Germany)
 2010: Arjen Robben and Mark van Bommel (Bayern Munich and Netherlands)
 2016: Antoine Griezmann (Atlético Madrid and France)
 2018: Dejan Lovren (Liverpool and Croatia)
 2021: Phil Foden, Raheem Sterling, John Stones and Kyle Walker (Manchester City and England) 
 2022: Ibrahima Konaté (Liverpool and France)
 Thirteen players have won both the UEFA Champions League and the Copa Libertadores:
 Juan Pablo Sorín with Juventus (1995–96) and River Plate (1996)
 Santiago Solari with River Plate (1996) and Real Madrid (2001–02)
 Dida with Cruzeiro (1997) and Milan (2002–03 and 2006–07)
 Cafu with São Paulo (1992 and 1993) and Milan (2006–07)
 Roque Júnior with Palmeiras (1999) and Milan (2002–03)
 Carlos Tevez with Boca Juniors (2003) and Manchester United (2007–08)
 Walter Samuel with Boca Juniors (2000) and Inter Milan (2009–10)
 Ronaldinho with Barcelona (2005–06) and Atlético Mineiro (2013)
 Neymar with Santos (2011) and Barcelona (2014–15)
 Danilo with Santos (2011) and Real Madrid (2015–16 and 2016–17)
 Rafinha with Bayern Munich (2012–13) and Flamengo (2019)
 Willy Caballero with Boca Juniors (2003) and Chelsea (2020–21)
 David Luiz with Chelsea (2011–12) and Flamengo (2022)

Relatives 
 Four father-son duos have won the competition, all for the same club:
 Cesare Maldini (1962–63) and Paolo Maldini (1988–89, 1989–90, 1993–94, 2002–03 and 2006–07), both for Milan
 Manuel Sanchís Martínez (1965–66) and Manuel Sanchís Hontiyuelo (1997–98 and 1999–2000), both for Real Madrid
 Carles Busquets (1991–92) and Sergio Busquets (2008–09, 2010–11, and 2014–15) both for Barcelona
 Zinedine Zidane (2001–02) and his two sons, Enzo Zidane (2016–17) and Luca Zidane (2017–18), all three for Real Madrid.
 Seven brother duos have won the competition:
 Michael Laudrup (1991–92 with Barcelona) and Brian Laudrup (1993–94 with Milan).
 Frank de Boer and Ronald de Boer (both in 1994–95 with Ajax).
 Gary Neville and Phil Neville (both in 1998–99 with Manchester United).
 Diego Milito (2009–10 with Inter Milan) and Gabriel Milito (2010–11 with Barcelona).
 Thiago Alcântara (2010–11 with Barcelona and 2019–20 with Bayern Munich) and Rafinha Alcântara (2014–15 with Barcelona).
 Enzo Zidane (2016–17) and Luca Zidane (2017–18), both for Real Madrid.
 Theo Hernandez (2017–18 with Real Madrid) and Lucas Hernandez (2019–20 with Bayern Munich).
 Only one grandfather-father-son trio have reached the final with their clubs:
 Marcos Alonso Imaz (1955–56, 1956–57, 1957–58, 1958–59, 1959–60 and 1961–62, all with Real Madrid), Marcos Alonso Peña (1985–86 with Barcelona) and Marcos Alonso Mendoza (2020–21 with Chelsea).

Oldest and youngest 
 The oldest player to win the tournament is Alessandro Costacurta, who was 41 years and 29 days old when Milan won against Liverpool on 23 May 2007.
 The youngest player to win the tournament is Gary Mills, who was 17 years and 201 days old when Nottingham Forest won against Malmö FF on 30 May 1979, on the virtue of having made one appearance in the competition that season, despite him not playing in the final match.
 The oldest player to play in the tournament is Marco Ballotta, who was 43 years and 252 days old when Lazio played against Real Madrid on 11 December 2007.
 The youngest player to play in the tournament is Youssoufa Moukoko, who was 16 years and 18 days old when Borussia Dortmund played against Zenit Saint Petersburg on 8 December 2020.
 The youngest player to play in and win a final is António Simões, who was 18 years and 139 days old when Benfica won against Real Madrid on 2 May 1962.
 The youngest player to play in and lose a final is Kiki Musampa, who was 18 years and 307 days old when Ajax lost against Juventus on 22 May 1996.
 The oldest player to play in and win a final is Paolo Maldini, who was 38 years and 331 days old when Milan won against Liverpool on 23 May 2007.
 The oldest player to play in and lose a final is Dino Zoff, who was 41 years and 86 days old when Juventus lost against Hamburger SV on 25 May 1983.
 The youngest player to play in the knockout phase in the Champions League era is Warren Zaïre-Emery, who was 16 years and 345 days old when Paris Saint-Germain played against Bayern Munich in the round of 16 on 14 February 2023.
 The oldest player to play in the knockout phase in the Champions League era is Mark Schwarzer, who was 41 years and 206 days old when Chelsea played against Atlético Madrid in semi-final on 30 April 2014.

Penalties 
 Cristiano Ronaldo has scored the most penalties (not including shoot-outs), converting 19 penalties out of 22 taken.
 Thierry Henry and Lionel Messi have failed to score the most penalties (not including shoot-outs), missing 5 penalties each.
 Iker Casillas has saved the most penalty kicks (not including shoot-outs), saving 7 out of 23 penalties faced.
 The oldest goalkeeper to save a penalty in the tournament is Jasmin Handanović, who was 39 years and 274 days old when he saved James Milner's penalty for Maribor against Liverpool on 1 November 2017.
 The youngest goalkeeper to save a penalty in the tournament is Mile Svilar, who was 18 years and 65 days old when he saved Anthony Martial's penalty for Benfica against  Manchester United on 31 October 2017.
 The fastest penalty ever awarded in the tournament was for Liverpool against Tottenham Hotspur in the final on 1 June 2019, which was given after 23 seconds and converted by Mohamed Salah.

Penalty shoot-out 
 Eight players scored two penalties in a shoot-out: 
 Robert Prosinečki (in 1988–89 and 1991 final, both with Red Star Belgrade)
 Xabi Alonso (in 2006–07 with Liverpool and in 2011–12 with Real Madrid)
 Frank Lampard and Ashley Cole (in 2008 final and in 2012 final, both with Chelsea)
 Mario Gómez (both penalties in 2011–12 with Bayern Munich)
 Antoine Griezmann, Gabi and Saúl (both penalties in 2015–16 with Atlético Madrid)
 Cristiano Ronaldo is the only player to miss two penalties in shoot-outs (out of three taken), missing one in the 2008 final with Manchester United and one in the 2011–12 semi-finals with Real Madrid.
 Manuel Neuer has saved a record five penalties in shoot-outs, stopping two in the 2007–08 round of 16 with Schalke 04, two in the 2011–12 semi-finals and one in the 2012 final with Bayern Munich.
 Two goalkeepers saved four penalties in a single shoot-out:
 Jan Möller saved four penalties (out of five) for Malmö FF during the shoot-out against 1. FC Magdeburg in the 1975–76 first round.
 Helmuth Duckadam kept every opposing shot out for Steaua București during the shoot-out against Barcelona in the 1986 final.

Own goals 
 23 players scored two own goals against their teams: Igor Akinfeev, Alex, Alex Sandro, Ânderson Polga, Wes Brown, Cadú, Gary Caldwell, Edu Dracena, Andrzej Grębosz, Iván Helguera, József Horváth, Tomáš Hubočan, Jardel, Phil Jones, Thomas Kleine, Iván Marcano, Jérémy Mathieu, Craig Moore, Gerard Piqué, Sergio Ramos, Stefan Savić, Raphaël Varane and Zoco.
 The fastest own goal ever scored in the tournament was by Iñigo Martínez, who put the ball into his own net after 69 seconds against his team Real Sociedad for Manchester United during the 2013–14 season.
 One player has scored an own goal in a final:
 Antoni Ramallets scored an own goal in 1961 against his team Barcelona for Benfica in the 32nd minute.

Goalkeeping 
 Iker Casillas holds the record for most clean sheets in the competition, with 57 (59 including 2 qualifying games): 50 with Real Madrid and 7 with Porto.
 Jens Lehmann holds the record for the most consecutive clean sheets in full matches, with eight for Arsenal across the 2004–05 (one match) and 2005–06 seasons (seven matches).  As for the total minutes, he has the highest number of continuous minutes without conceding goals. In total, this lasted 853 minutes, divided into three seasons:
 115 minutes (a full match and 25 minutes from a single match) in the 2004–05 season
 647 minutes (seven full matches and 17 minutes before being sent off in the final) in the 2005–06 season
 91 minutes (he conceded the first goal in the 91th minute in his first match) in the 2006–07 season
 Two goalkeepers hold the record of three clean sheets in competition finals:
 Heinz Stuy in 1971, 1972 and 1973, all with Ajax.
 Sepp Maier in 1974 (replay), 1975 and 1976, all with Bayern Munich.
 Four goalkeepers have kept a record nine clean sheets in a single season:
 Sebastiano Rossi with Milan in 1993–94
 Santiago Cañizares with Valencia in 2000–01
 Keylor Navas with Real Madrid in 2015–16
 Édouard Mendy with Chelsea in 2020–21
 Marco Ballotta was the oldest goalkeeper to play in the tournament, playing for Lazio against Real Madrid on 11 December 2007, aged .
 Maarten Vandevoordt was the youngest goalkeeper to start a Champions League game, doing so for Genk against Napoli on 10 December 2019, aged 17 years and 287 days.
 Two goalkeepers have won the competition with two clubs:
 Jimmy Rimmer with Manchester United in 1968, and with Aston Villa in 1982.
 Edwin van der Sar with Ajax in 1995, and with Manchester United in 2008.
 Edwin van der Sar was the oldest goalkeeper to play in and win a final, doing so in 2008 with Manchester United, aged 37 years and 205 days.
 Iker Casillas was the youngest goalkeeper to play in and win a final, doing so in 2000 with Real Madrid, aged 19 years and 4 days.
 Dino Zoff was the oldest goalkeeper to play in a final, playing in Juventus' defeat to Hamburger SV in 1983, aged 41 years and 86 days.
 Edwin van der Sar is the only goalkeeper to play in five Champions League finals, doing so with Ajax in 1995 and 1996, and with Manchester United in 2008, 2009 and 2011.
 Gianluigi Buffon is the only goalkeeper to play in three finals and lose them all, doing so with Juventus in 2003, 2015 and 2017.
 Four goalkeepers played for two clubs in a final:
 Edwin van der Sar with Ajax in 1995 and 1996, and with Manchester United in 2008, 2009 and 2011.
 Hans-Jörg Butt with Bayer Leverkusen in 2002, and with Bayern Munich in 2010.
 Keylor Navas with Real Madrid in 2016, 2017 and 2018, and with Paris Saint-Germain in 2020.
 Thibaut Courtois with Atlético Madrid in 2014, and with Real Madrid in 2022.
 Juan Alonso has won the most titles for a goalkeeper, winning five consecutive titles in 1955–56, 1956–57, 1957–58, 1958–59 and 1959–60, all with Real Madrid. He played in the first three finals and was a non-substitute in the latter two.
 Seven other goalkeepers have won the Champions League on three occasions (six starter goalkeepers and one non-playing substitute):
 Heinz Stuy with Ajax (1970–71, 1971–72 and 1972–73)
 Sepp Maier with Bayern Munich (1973–74, 1974–75 and 1975–76)
 Ray Clemence with Liverpool (1976–77, 1977–78 and 1980–81)
 Víctor Valdés with Barcelona (2005–06, 2008–09 and 2010–11)
 Iker Casillas with Real Madrid (1999–2000, 2001–02 and 2013–14)
 Keylor Navas with Real Madrid (2015–16, 2016–17 and 2017–18)
 Kiko Casilla with Real Madrid (2015–16, 2016–17 and 2017–18) – he was an unused substitute in all three finals
 Two goalkeepers won all three major UEFA club competitions they have played in:
 Stefano Tacconi: 1983–84 European Cup Winners' Cup, 1984–85 European Cup and 1989–90 UEFA Cup, all with Juventus
 Vítor Baía: 1996–97 UEFA Cup Winners' Cup with Barcelona, 2002–03 UEFA Cup and 2003–04 UEFA Champions League with Porto
 Three goalkeepers have won the tournament as well as both the FIFA World Cup and the UEFA European Championship:
 Sepp Maier won the 1973–74, 1974–75 and 1975–76 European Cup with Bayern Munich, and both the 1974 FIFA World Cup and UEFA Euro 1972 with West Germany
 Fabien Barthez won the 1992–93 UEFA Champions League with Marseille, and both the 1998 FIFA World Cup and UEFA Euro 2000 with France
 Iker Casillas won the 1999–2000, 2001–02 and 2013–14 UEFA Champions League with Real Madrid, and both the 2010 FIFA World Cup and UEFA Euro 2008 and 2012 with Spain
 The following goalkeepers have additionally won both the tournament and the FIFA World Cup:
 Bodo Illgner won the 1997–98 and 1999–2000 UEFA Champions League with Real Madrid, and the 1990 FIFA World Cup with West Germany
 Manuel Neuer won the 2012–13 and 2019–20 UEFA Champions League with Bayern Munich, and the 2014 FIFA World Cup with Germany
 The following goalkeepers have additionally won both the tournament and the UEFA European Championship:
 Hans van Breukelen won the 1987–88 European Cup with PSV Eindhoven, and UEFA Euro 1988 with Netherlands
 Peter Schmeichel won the 1998–99 UEFA Champions League with Manchester United, and UEFA Euro 1992 with Denmark
 Six goalkeepers have lifted the trophy as captain:
 Juan Alonso with Real Madrid (1958)
 Stevan Stojanović with Red Star Belgrade (1991)
 Andoni Zubizarreta with Barcelona (1992)
 Peter Schmeichel with Manchester United (1999)
 Iker Casillas with Real Madrid (2014)
 Manuel Neuer with Bayern Munich (2020)

Disciplinary 
 Only three players have ever been sent off in a Champions League final: Jens Lehmann (Arsenal) in the 2006 final against Barcelona (sent off by Terje Hauge in the 18th minute after bringing down Samuel Eto'o); Didier Drogba (Chelsea) in the 2008 final against Manchester United (sent off by Ľuboš Micheľ in the 116th minute for slapping Nemanja Vidić); and Juan Cuadrado (Juventus) in the 2017 final against Real Madrid (second yellow given by Felix Brych in the 84th minute for pushing Sergio Ramos). All three players' teams lost their respective finals.
 Edgar Davids, Zlatan Ibrahimović and Sergio Ramos jointly hold the record for the most red cards in the Champions League; they have each been sent off four times.
 Zlatan Ibrahimović (with Juventus, Inter Milan and Paris Saint-Germain), Arturo Vidal (with Bayern Munich, Barcelona and Inter Milan) and Patrick Vieira (with Arsenal, Juventus and Inter Milan) are the only players to have been sent off for three clubs in the Champions League.
 Olexandr Kucher holds the record for the fastest red card in a Champions League match, being sent off after 3 minutes and 59 seconds for Shakhtar Donetsk against Bayern Munich in the 2014–15 season.
 Sergio Ramos holds the record for the most yellow cards in the Champions League, with 41+1 (once double yellow cards turned red) along with three straight red cards.

Captaincy 
The following table shows the captains who have won the title:

 Only two players have lifted the trophy as captain on three occasions:
 Franz Beckenbauer with Bayern Munich in 1974, 1975 and 1976
 Sergio Ramos with Real Madrid in 2016, 2017 and 2018
 Two players participated in the final as captain on four occasions:
 Franz Beckenbauer with Bayern Munich in 1974 (2), 1975 and 1976
 Franco Baresi with Milan in 1989, 1990, 1993 and 1995
 Six other players participated in the final as captain on three occasions:
 Francisco Gento with Real Madrid in 1962, 1964 and 1966 
 Mário Coluna with Benfica in 1963, 1965 and 1968 
 Armando Picchi with Inter Milan in 1964, 1965 and 1967
 Paolo Maldini with Milan in 2003, 2005 and 2007
 Sergio Ramos with Real Madrid in 2016, 2017 and 2018
 Jordan Henderson with Liverpool in 2018, 2019 and 2022
 Paolo Maldini is the oldest captain to lift the trophy, doing so with Milan in 2007 aged 38 years and 331 days.
 Didier Deschamps is the youngest captain to lift the trophy, doing so with Marseille in 1993 aged 24 years and 223 days.
 David Weir became the oldest player to start as captain in the Champions League era when he led Rangers against Bursaspor in 2010–11, aged 40 years and 212 days.
 Rúben Neves became the youngest player to start as captain in the Champions League era when he led Porto against Maccabi Tel Aviv in 2015–16, aged 18 years and 221 days.

Trivia 
 Saul Malatrasi was the first player to win the trophy with two clubs, doing so with Inter Milan in 1964–65 and with Milan in 1968–69, while Miodrag Belodedici was the first player to win the trophy with two clubs and played both finals, doing so with Steaua București in 1985–86 and with Red Star Belgrade in 1990–91.
 Only four players have reached the final with three clubs:
 Didier Deschamps with Marseille in 1993, with Juventus in 1996, 1997 and 1998, and with Valencia in 2001.
 Clarence Seedorf with Ajax in 1995, with Real Madrid in 1998, and with Milan in 2003, 2005 and 2007.
 Patrice Evra with Monaco in 2004, with Manchester United in 2008, 2009 and 2011, and with Juventus in 2015.
 Thiago with Barcelona in 2011, with Bayern Munich in 2020, and with Liverpool in 2022.
 Zlatan Ibrahimović is the only player to reach the Champions League quarter-finals with five clubs, doing so with Ajax, Juventus, Barcelona, Milan and Paris Saint-Germain.
 Patrice Evra lost a record four finals in the competition, doing so in 2004 with Monaco, in 2009 and 2011 with Manchester United, and in 2015 with Juventus, with his side losing to Barcelona on each of the latter three occasions. He is the only player to lose the final with three clubs.
 Zinedine Zidane (with Bordeaux in the 1996 UEFA Cup Final and with Juventus in the 1997 UEFA Champions League Final), Christian Eriksen (with Tottenham Hotspur in the 2019 UEFA Champions League Final and with Inter Milan in the 2020 UEFA Europa League Final) and Edinson Cavani (with Paris Saint-Germain in the 2020 UEFA Champions League Final and with Manchester United in the 2021 UEFA Europa League Final) are the only players to lose two consecutive European club finals in two different competitions.
 Kingsley Coman was the first player to score in a final against a former club, doing so for Bayern Munich in their 1–0 win against Paris Saint-Germain in the 2020 final.
 Moise Kean (born 28 February 2000) was the first player born in the 2000s to play in the Champions League, playing in Juventus's match against Sevilla on 22 November 2016.
 Jadon Sancho (born 25 March 2000) was the first player born in the 2000s to score in the Champions League, playing in Borussia Dortmund's match against Atlético Madrid on 24 October 2018.
 Han-Noah Massengo (born 7 July 2001) was the first player born in the 21st century to play in the Champions League, playing in Monaco's match against Club Brugge on 6 November 2018.
 Rodrygo (born 9 January 2001) was the first player born in the 21st century to score in the Champions League, doing so for Real Madrid against Galatasaray on 6 November 2019.
 Three players lost three finals with their clubs, and never won the tournament:
 Raul Machado (1963, 1965 and 1968 with Benfica).
 Paolo Montero (1997, 1998 and 2003 with Juventus).
 Gianluigi Buffon (2003, 2015 and 2017 with Juventus).

Managers

All-time managerial appearances 

The table below does not include the qualification stage of the competition.

Notes

Final and winning records 

 Carlo Ancelotti is the only manager to win the competition on four occasions, doing so in 2002–03 and 2006–07 with Milan, and in 2013–14 and 2021–22 with Real Madrid.
 Two other managers have won the competition three times:
 Bob Paisley in 1976–77, 1977–78 and 1980–81 (all with Liverpool)
 Zinedine Zidane in 2015–16, 2016–17 and 2017–18 (all with Real Madrid) – He is the only manager to win three consecutive titles
 Only one manager has managed five finalists:
 Carlo Ancelotti in 2003, 2005, 2007 (Milan), 2014 and 2022 (Real Madrid)
 Four other managers have managed four finalists:
 Miguel Muñoz in 1960, 1962, 1964 and 1966 (all with Real Madrid)
 Marcello Lippi in 1996, 1997, 1998 and 2003 (all with Juventus)
 Alex Ferguson in 1999, 2008, 2009 and 2011 (all with Manchester United)
 Jürgen Klopp in 2013 (Borussia Dortmund), 2018, 2019 and 2022 (Liverpool)
 Two managers lost a record three finals:
 Marcello Lippi lost in 1997, 1998 and 2003, all with Juventus.
 Jürgen Klopp lost in 2013 with Borussia Dortmund, and in 2018 and 2022 with Liverpool.
 Seven individuals have won the European Cup/Champions League as a player then later as a manager, four of them with the same club:
 Miguel Muñoz of Real Madrid won as a player in 1955–56 and 1956–57, and as a manager in 1959–60 and 1965–66.
 Carlo Ancelotti won as a player in 1988–89 and 1989–90, and as a manager in 2002–03 and 2006–07 with Milan, then as a manager in 2013–14 and 2021–22 with Real Madrid.
 Pep Guardiola of Barcelona won as a player in 1991–92, and as a manager in 2008–09 and 2010–11.
 Giovanni Trapattoni won as a player in 1962–63 and 1968–69, both with Milan, and as a manager in 1984–85 with Juventus.
 Johan Cruyff won as a player in 1970–71, 1971–72 and 1972–73, all with Ajax, and as a manager in 1991–92 with Barcelona.
 Frank Rijkaard won as a player in 1988–89 and 1989–90, both with Milan, in 1994–95 with Ajax, and as a manager in 2005–06 with Barcelona.
 Zinedine Zidane of Real Madrid won as player in 2001–02, and as a manager in 2015–16, 2016–17 and 2017–18.
 Eight other individuals have appeared in the final as a player then later as a manager, though did not win while in one or either of the roles:
 Vicente del Bosque of Real Madrid lost as a player in 1981, but won as a manager in 2000 and 2002.
 Fabio Capello lost as a player in 1973 with Juventus and as a manager in 1993 and 1995, but won as a manager in 1994, all as a manager with Milan.
 Didier Deschamps won as a player in 1993 with Marseille and 1996 with Juventus and lost with Juventus in 1997 and 1998 (also lost in 2001 with Valencia as an unused substitute), and lost as a manager with Monaco in 2004.
 Jupp Heynckes lost as a player in 1977 with Borussia Mönchengladbach, but won as a manager in 1998 with Real Madrid and in 2013 with Bayern Munich, and lost as a manager in 2012 with Bayern Munich.
 Anghel Iordănescu of Steaua București won as a player in 1986, but lost as a manager in 1989.
 Nils Liedholm lost as a player in 1958 with Milan and as a manager with Roma in 1984.
 Ferenc Puskás won as a player in 1960 (also won in 1959 and 1966 as a team member not selected for the final) and lost in 1962 and 1964, all with Real Madrid, and lost as a manager in 1971 with Panathinaikos.
 Hansi Flick of Bayern Munich lost as a player in 1987, but won as a manager in 2020.
 Five managers have won the title with two clubs:
 Ernst Happel did so with Feyenoord in 1969–70, and with Hamburger SV in 1982–83.
 Ottmar Hitzfeld did so with Borussia Dortmund in 1996–97, and with Bayern Munich in 2000–01 and is the only manager to have won two trophies each with two clubs from the same domestic league.
 José Mourinho did so with Porto in 2003–04, and with Inter Milan in 2009–10.
 Jupp Heynckes did so with Real Madrid in 1997–98, and with Bayern Munich in 2012–13.
 Carlo Ancelotti did so with Milan in 2002–03 and 2006–07, and with Real Madrid in 2013–14 and 2021–22.
 Thomas Tuchel is the only manager to reach the final in consecutive seasons with two clubs (Paris Saint-Germain in 2020 and Chelsea in 2021). 
 Italian managers have won the competition a record twelve times.
 Five clubs, on nine total occasions, changed their manager during the season and went on to win the tournament:
 Real Madrid replaced Manuel Fleitas Solich with Miguel Muñoz in 1959–60, replaced John Toshack with Vicente del Bosque in 1999–2000, and replaced Rafael Benítez with Zinedine Zidane in 2015–16
 Bayern Munich replaced Udo Lattek with Dettmar Cramer in 1974–75, and replaced Niko Kovač with Hansi Flick in 2019–20
 Aston Villa replaced Ron Saunders with Tony Barton in 1981–82
 Marseille replaced Jean Fernandez with Raymond Goethals in 1992–93
 Chelsea replaced André Villas-Boas with Roberto Di Matteo in 2011–12, and replaced Frank Lampard with Thomas Tuchel in 2020–21
 Zinedine Zidane is the only manager to win the tournament three times in his first three seasons as manager in the competition, doing so with Real Madrid in 2015–16, 2016–17 and 2017–18.
 The following five managers have also won the tournament two times in their first two appearances:
 José Villalonga (1955–56 and 1956–57, both with Real Madrid)
 Béla Guttmann (1960–61 and 1961–62, both with Benfica)
 Dettmar Cramer (1974–75 and 1975–76, both with Bayern Munich)
 Bob Paisley (1976–77 and 1977–78, both with Liverpool)
 Arrigo Sacchi (1988–89 and 1989–90, both with Milan)

Winning other trophies 

 Pep Guardiola of Spain and Hansi Flick of Germany are the only two managers to have won the sextuple with Barcelona in 2009 and Bayern Munich in 2020 respectively.

 Vicente del Bosque is the only manager to have won the Champions League, the World Cup and the European Championship:
 Real Madrid in 2000 and 2002, the World Cup in 2010 and the European Championship in 2012 with Spain
 One other manager has won the Champions League as well as the World Cup:
 Marcello Lippi won the Champions League with Juventus in 1996 and the World Cup in 2006 with Italy. In addition, he won the 2013 AFC Champions League with Guangzhou Evergrande, to become the only manager to win both the AFC and UEFA Champions League.
 Two other managers have won the European Cup as well as the European Championship:
 José Villalonga won the European Cup with Real Madrid in 1956 and 1957 and the European Championship in 1964 with Spain
 Rinus Michels won the European Cup with Ajax in 1971 and the European Championship in 1988 with Netherlands
 Two managers have won the Cup Winners' Cup and the European Cup with the same club in two consecutive seasons:
 Nereo Rocco of Milan won the Cup Winners' Cup in 1968 and the European Cup in 1969
 Giovanni Trapattoni of Juventus won the Cup Winners' Cup in 1984 and the European Cup in 1985
 Three managers have won the UEFA Cup and the European Cup in two consecutive seasons, two of them with the same club:
 Bob Paisley won the UEFA Cup in 1976 and the European Cup in 1977, both with Liverpool
 José Mourinho won the UEFA Cup in 2003 and the Champions League in 2004, both with Porto
 Rafael Benítez won the UEFA Cup in 2004 with Valencia and the Champions League in 2005 with Liverpool
 Rafael Benítez is the only manager to have won the FIFA Club World Cup, the UEFA Cup, and the UEFA Champions League.
 Two managers have won the Cup Winners' Cup, the UEFA Cup and the European Cup:
 Giovanni Trapattoni of Juventus won the UEFA Cup in 1977 and 1993, the Cup Winners' Cup in 1984 and the European Cup in 1985. He also won the UEFA Cup in 1991 with Inter Milan.
 Udo Lattek won the European Cup in 1974 with Bayern Munich, the UEFA Cup in 1979 with Borussia Mönchengladbach and the Cup Winners' Cup in 1982 with Barcelona.
 Only one manager won the UEFA Cup/UEFA Europa League, the UEFA Champions League and the UEFA Europa Conference League:
 José Mourinho won the UEFA Cup in 2003 with Porto, the UEFA Champions League with the same club in the following year, then the UEFA Champions League again with Inter Milan in 2010, the UEFA Europa League with Manchester United in 2017 and the UEFA Europa Conference League with Roma in 2022.

Oldest and youngest 
 José Villalonga was the youngest coach to win the European Cup, doing so with Real Madrid in 1955–56 (aged 36 years and 185 days).
 Pep Guardiola was the youngest coach to win the Champions League, doing so with Barcelona in 2008–09 (aged 38 years and 129 days).
 Raymond Goethals was the oldest coach to win the competition, doing so with Marseille in 1992–93 (aged 71 years and 232 days).
 Bob Houghton was the youngest coach (aged 27 years and 322 days) to feature in and win a European Cup and Champions League match, doing so with Malmö FF against 1. FC Magdeburg in the 1975–76 European Cup first round.
 Julian Nagelsmann was the youngest coach (aged 31 years and 58 days) to feature in a Champions League match, doing so with 1899 Hoffenheim against Shakhtar Donetsk in the 2018–19 group stage, and also the youngest coach (aged 32 years and 56 days) to win a Champions League match, doing so with RB Leipzig against Benfica in the 2019–20 group stage.
 Mircea Lucescu was the oldest coach (aged 76 years and 133 days) to feature in a European Cup and Champions League match, doing so with Dynamo Kyiv against Benfica in the 2021–22 group stage, and also the oldest coach (aged 75 years and 132 days) to win a Champions League match, doing so with Dynamo Kyiv against Ferencváros in the 2020–21 group stage.

Other records 
 Alex Ferguson won a record 107 matches in tournament history (excluding six wins in qualifying rounds and 2008 final win on penalties). He won five European Cup matches with Aberdeen and 102 UEFA Champions League matches with Manchester United.
 Carlo Ancelotti has won a record 105 UEFA Champions League matches (excluding five wins in qualifying rounds and the 2003 final win on penalties).
 Pep Guardiola has won a record 39 matches in the knockout phase.
Zinedine Zidane holds the record for most consecutive knockout tie wins with twelve, all registered as manager of Real Madrid. His knockout run started with a 4–0 aggregate win over Roma in the 2015–16 round of 16 and continued until the 2018 final win against Liverpool. The streak saw him win a record three consecutive trophies. It came to an end when Real Madrid were beaten 4–2 on aggregate by Manchester City in the 2019–20 round of 16. 
 Jupp Heynckes and Hansi Flick hold the joint record for most consecutive victories in the competition with twelve wins each, all with Bayern Munich:
 Heynckes' winning run started on 2 April 2013 by beating Juventus 2–0 in the quarter-finals, then winning the second leg, two semi-final matches, and the 2013 final against Borussia Dortmund, before retiring. After Bayern's two group stage matches with Carlo Ancelotti in the 2017–18 season, Heynckes came out of retirement, winning the remaining four group stage matches, two round of 16 matches, then reaching the 12th successive win on 3 April 2018 by defeating Sevilla 2–1 in the first leg of quarter-finals; the run ended with a goalless draw against Sevilla in the second leg.
 Flick's winning run started on 6 November 2019 by beating Olympiacos 2–0 in the fourth group stage match, then winning the next two group matches, two round of 16 matches, the single-legged quarter-final and semi-final matches, and the 2020 final against Paris Saint-Germain. The run continued in the 2020–21 season as Bayern won four group matches, with Flick reaching the 12th successive win on 25 November 2020 by defeating Red Bull Salzburg 3–1; the run ended with a 1–1 draw against Atlético Madrid in the fifth group stage match.
 Louis van Gaal and Julian Nagelsmann hold the joint record for most consecutive victories in the group stage with fourteen wins each:
 van Gaal's winning run started with Barcelona on 8 December 1999 by beating Sparta Prague 5–0 in the 1999–2000 season, then winning another four matches in the same season, and eight matches in two group stages in the 2002–03 season, before his last win with Bayern Munich 3–0 against Maccabi Haifa in the 2009–10 season.
 Nagelsmann's winning run started with RB Leipzig on 2 December 2020 by beating İstanbul Başakşehir 4–3 in the 2020–21 season, then another victory in the same season, before winning twelve matches with Bayern Munich in the 2021–22 and 2022–23 seasons.
 Ernst Happel is the only manager to reach the Champions League final with three clubs, doing so with Feyenoord in 1970, Club Brugge in 1978 and Hamburger SV in 1983.
 José Mourinho is the only manager to reach the Champions League semi-finals with four clubs, doing so with Porto in 2003–04, with Chelsea in 2004–05, 2006–07 and 2013–14, with Inter Milan in 2009–10 and with Real Madrid in 2010–11, 2011–12 and 2012–13.
 Carlo Ancelotti became the first coach to feature in the Champions League group stage with eight clubs: Parma, Juventus, Milan, Chelsea, Paris Saint-Germain, Real Madrid, Bayern Munich and Napoli.
 Three coaches have reached the final three consecutive times, all with the same team:
 Fabio Capello with Milan (1993, 1994 and 1995)
 Marcello Lippi with Juventus (1996, 1997 and 1998)
 Zinedine Zidane with Real Madrid (2016, 2017 and 2018)
 Two non-European coaches won the European Cup twice:
 Luis Carniglia with Real Madrid (1958 and 1959)
 Helenio Herrera with Inter Milan (1964 and 1965)
 Six non-European coaches lost their final matches:
 Fernando Riera with Benfica (1963)
 Otto Glória with Benfica (1968)
 Juan Carlos Lorenzo with Atlético Madrid (1974)
 Héctor Cúper with Valencia (2000 and 2001)
 Diego Simeone with Atlético Madrid (2014 and 2016)
 Mauricio Pochettino with Tottenham Hotspur (2019)
 In four finals, two coaches from the same nation were faced:
 England: Brian Clough with Nottingham Forest against Bob Houghton with Malmö FF (1979)
 Italy: Carlo Ancelotti with Milan against Marcello Lippi with Juventus (2003)
 Germany: Jupp Heynckes with Bayern Munich against Jürgen Klopp with Borussia Dortmund (2013)
 Germany: Hansi Flick with Bayern Munich against Thomas Tuchel with Paris Saint-Germain (2020)
 In 2019–20, three German managers reached the semi-finals (Hansi Flick with Bayern Munich, Julian Nagelsmann with RB Leipzig and Thomas Tuchel with Paris Saint-Germain), the most by any single nationality to reach the last four in the competition's history.
 A record four German managers (Including East and West Germany) also reached the quarter-finals in twice:
 1976–77 (Dettmar Cramer with Bayern Munich, Udo Lattek with Borussia Mönchengladbach, Walter Fritzsch with Dynamo Dresden and Friedhelm Konietzka with Zürich).
 2020–21 (Hansi Flick with Bayern Munich, Jürgen Klopp with Liverpool, Edin Terzić with Borussia Dortmund and Thomas Tuchel with Chelsea).

Referees 

 Felix Brych has made the most appearances in the competition as a referee, having officiated 69 matches.
 Four referees have officiated two finals:
 Leo Horn in 1957 and 1962
 Gottfried Dienst in 1961 and 1965
 Concetto Lo Bello in 1968 and 1970
 Károly Palotai in 1976 and 1981
Björn Kuipers officiated a record nine matches during the 2020–21 season.
 Gottfried Dienst is the only referee to have officiated the final of the European Cup/Champions League, the FIFA World Cup and the UEFA European Championship, with the 1961 and 1965 European Cup Final, and in the 1966 FIFA World Cup Final and UEFA Euro 1968 Final.
 The following referees have additionally officiated the final of both the European Cup/Champions League and the FIFA World Cup:
 Jack Taylor, with the 1971 European Cup Final, and in the 1974 FIFA World Cup Final.
 Sándor Puhl, with the 1997 UEFA Champions League Final, and in the 1994 FIFA World Cup Final.
 Pierluigi Collina, with the 1999 UEFA Champions League Final, and in the 2002 FIFA World Cup Final.
 Howard Webb, with the 2010 UEFA Champions League Final, and in the 2010 FIFA World Cup Final.
 Nicola Rizzoli, with the 2013 UEFA Champions League Final, and in the 2014 FIFA World Cup Final.
 The following referees have additionally officiated the final of both the European Cup/Champions League and the UEFA European Championship:
 Arthur Edward Ellis, with the 1956 European Cup Final, and in the UEFA Euro 1960 Final.
 Arthur Holland, with the 1963 European Cup Final, and in the UEFA Euro 1964 Final.
 Nicolae Rainea, with the 1983 European Cup Final, and in the UEFA Euro 1980 Final. 
 Michel Vautrot, with the 1986 European Cup Final, and in the UEFA Euro 1988 Final.
 Markus Merk, with the 2003 UEFA Champions League Final, and in the UEFA Euro 2004 Final.
 Pedro Proença, with the 2012 UEFA Champions League Final, and in the UEFA Euro 2012 Final.
 Björn Kuipers, with the 2014 UEFA Champions League Final, and in the UEFA Euro 2020 Final.
 Mark Clattenburg, with the 2016 UEFA Champions League Final, and in the UEFA Euro 2016 Final.
 Stéphanie Frappart became the first and the only woman to referee a men's UEFA Champions League match, when she officiated a group stage game between Juventus and Dynamo Kyiv on 2 December 2020.

Disciplinary 

 Felix Brych has awarded a record 271 yellow cards, 17 of which were second yellows that then turned to a red card.
 Markus Merk has awarded a record 12 direct red cards.
 Felix Brych has awarded a record 27 penalties.

Presidents 
	
 Santiago Bernabéu and Florentino Pérez are the presidents whose club has won the most titles with him in charge, six European Cups, both with Real Madrid: in 1955–56, 1956–57, 1957–58, 1958–59, 1959–60 and 1965–66 for the former, and in 2001–02, 2013–14, 2015–16, 2016–17, 2017–18 and 2021–22 for the latter.	
 One further president was in charge when his club won five European Cups/UEFA Champions League:	
 Silvio Berlusconi as a president of Milan in 1988–89, 1989–90, 1993–94, 2002–03 and 2006–07.
 Franco Carraro was the youngest president in charge when his club won the competition, with Milan in 1968–69, aged 29 years and 173 days.
 Florentino Pérez was the oldest president in charge when his club won the competition, with Real Madrid in 2021–22, aged 75 years and 81 days.
 Jaap van Praag and Michael van Praag are the first father and son in the position of president when their club won the competition, Ajax. This team won the Champions League in different periods with these presidents, in 1970–71, 1971–72, 1972–73 and 1994–95.
 Angelo Moratti and Massimo Moratti are the second father and son in the position of president when their club won the competition, Inter Milan. This team won the Champions League in different periods with these presidents, in 1963–64, 1964–65 and 2009–10.

Attendance 
	
	
 The match between Celtic and Leeds United in 1969–70 semi-final second leg, is the one with the highest attendance in the history of the tournament with 135,805. The match was played at Hampden Park in Glasgow, Scotland.
 The match between Barcelona and Paris Saint-Germain in 1994–95 quarter-final first leg, is the one with the highest attendance in the Champions League era with 115,500. The match was played at Camp Nou in Barcelona, Spain.	
The highest-attended final in competition history was the 1960 final, which was played at Hampden Park in Glasgow, Scotland, in front of 127,621 spectators. In the Champions League era, the 1999 final at Camp Nou in Barcelona had the highest attendance (90,245).
 The 2020 final is the one with the lowest attendance, being played behind closed doors at the Estádio da Luz in Lisbon due to the COVID-19 pandemic. The 2021 final at the Estádio do Dragão in Porto was also played with a reduced attendance of 14,110 due to the pandemic. Aside from these two anomalies, the final with the lowest attendance was the 1961 final between Benfica and Barcelona, played at the Wankdorf Stadium in Bern, Switzerland, in front of a crowd of 26,732, although the replay of the 1974 final at the Heysel Stadium in Brussels was attended by 23,325.

See also 
 List of European Cup and UEFA Champions League finals
 List of European Cup and UEFA Champions League winning managers
 List of UEFA Cup and Europa League finals
 UEFA club competition records and statistics
 UEFA Cup and Europa League records and statistics

Notes

References

Bibliography

External links 
 UEFA.com
 Top Scorers – European Champions Cup/League at Euro.Futbal.org

Statistics
 
All-time football league tables
UEFA